= Gothic architecture =

Architectural style of medieval Europe

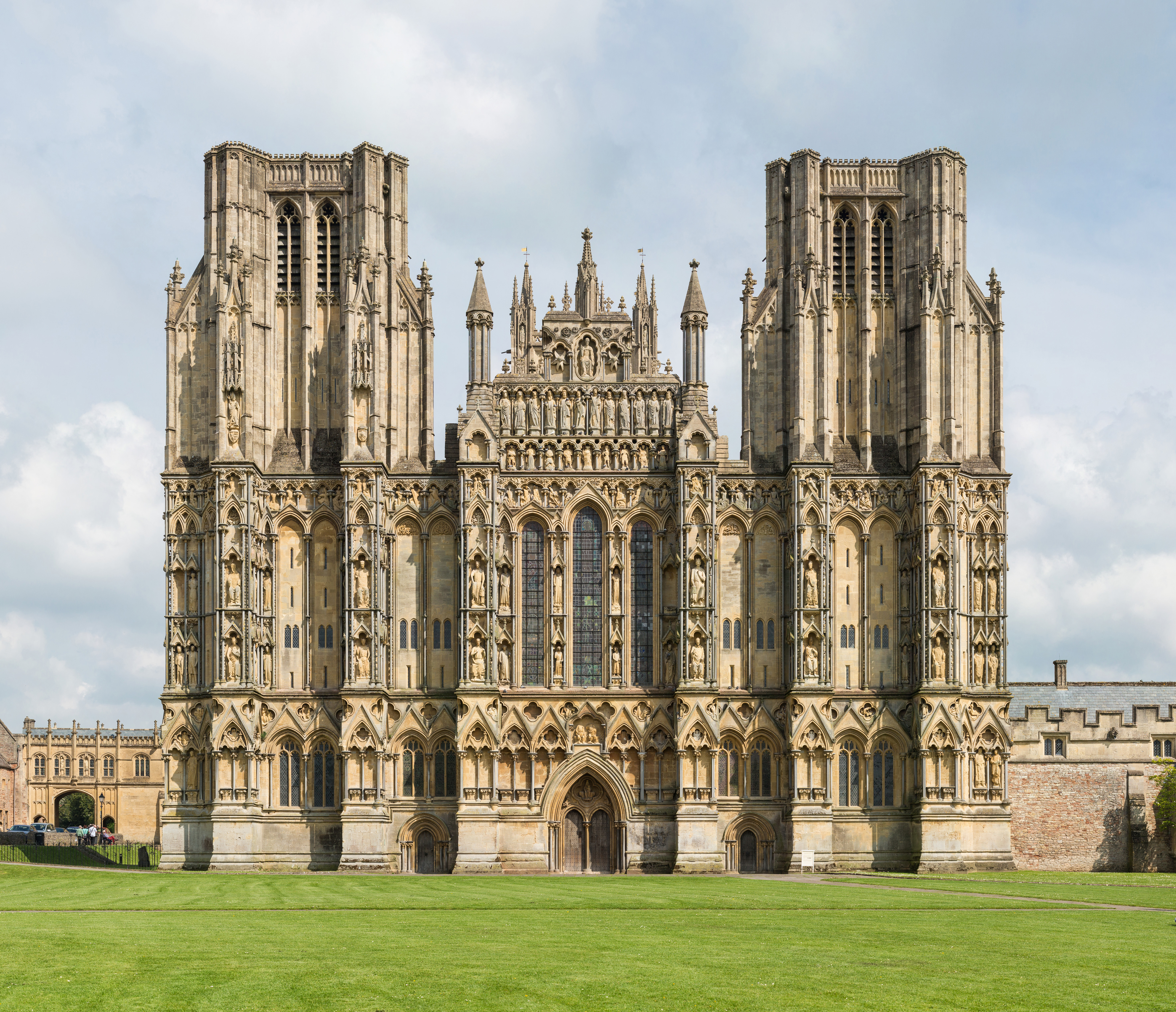
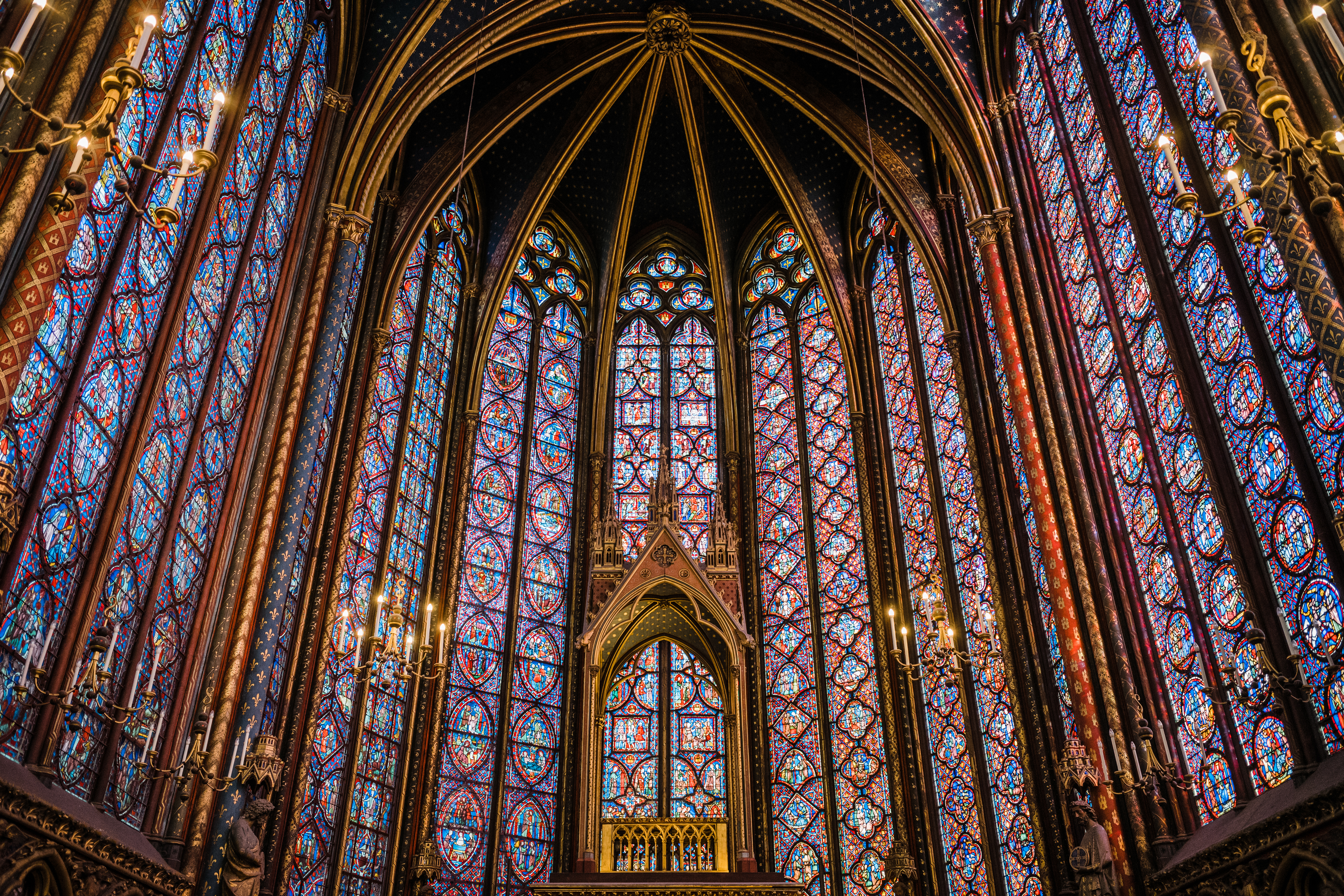
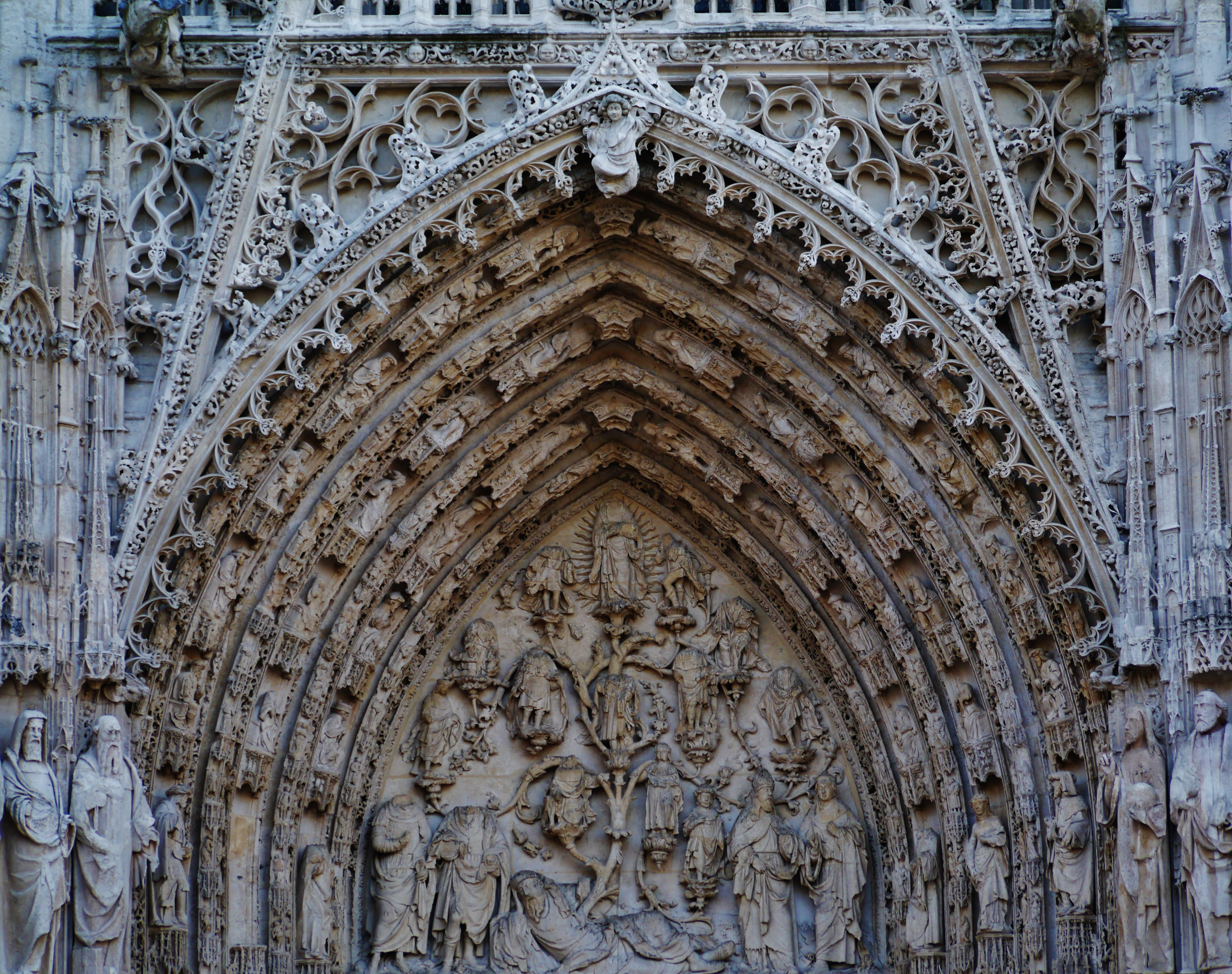
- Top: West front of Wells Cathedral in England (1225–1240); middle: Sainte-Chapelle in Paris (1238–1248); bottom: tympanum of Rouen Cathedral (15th century)

Additional media
- Years active: Late 12th century–16th century
- Location: Catholic Europe
- Influences: Romanesque architecture, Islamic architecture, Byzantine architecture
- Influenced: Gothic Revival architecture

Gothic architecture is an architectural style that was prevalent in Europe from the late 12th to the 16th century, during the High and Late Middle Ages, surviving into the 17th and 18th centuries in some areas. It evolved from Romanesque architecture and was succeeded by Renaissance architecture. The style is characterised by pointed arches, rib vaults, flying buttresses and large, traceried stained glass windows. It originated in the Île-de-France and Picardy regions of northern France. The Abbey of Saint-Denis, near Paris, is considered to be the first Gothic building. Its choir was reconstructed between 1140 and 1144, drawing together the developing Gothic architectural features. The style at the time was sometimes known as opus Francigenum (lit. 'French work'); the term Gothic was first applied contemptuously during the later Renaissance, by those ambitious to revive the architecture of classical antiquity.

With the development of Renaissance architecture in Italy during the mid-15th century, the Gothic style was supplanted by the new style, but in some regions, notably England and what is now Belgium, Gothic continued to flourish and develop into the 16th century. A series of Gothic revivals began in mid-18th century England, spread through 19th century Europe and continued, largely for churches and university buildings, into the 20th century.

The Gothic style is particularly associated with church architecture, but it is also the architecture of many castles, palaces, town halls, guildhalls, universities and houses. Many of the finest examples of Gothic architecture are listed by UNESCO as World Heritage Sites.

== Name ==
Medieval contemporaries characterised the style in Latin as opus Francigenum ("French work" or "Frankish work"), as opus modernum ("modern work"), or as novum opus ("new work"). Some Italian speakers called it maniera tedesca ("German style").

The term "Gothic architecture" originated as a pejorative description. The Renaissance writer Giorgio Vasari used the term "barbarous German style" in his Lives of the Artists (1550) to describe what became known as Gothic architecture, and he attributed various architectural features to the Goths, whom he held responsible for destroying the ancient buildings after they conquered Rome, and for erecting new ones in this style. When Vasari wrote, Italy had experienced a century of Renaissance architecture, taken as evidence of a new era of learning and refinement. Thus the Gothic style, being in opposition to classical architecture, was widely associated with the destruction of progress and of sophistication. Vasari was echoed in the 16th century by François Rabelais, who referred to "Gotz" and "Ostrogotz".

The polymath architect Christopher Wren (1632–1723) disapproved of the label "Gothic" for pointed architecture. He compared it to Islamic architecture, which he called the "Saracen style", pointing out that the pointed arch was not owed to the Goths but to Islam. Wren was one of the few to spread the belief that it was not the Europeans, but the "Saracens" who had originated the Gothic style, mentioning Europe's architectural debt to the Saracens no fewer than twelve times in his writings. He believed that Europeans had first seen "Saracenic" pointed arches in the First Crusade, a theory which is now generally rejected (see 'Influences', below). Wren also broke with tradition in his assumption that Gothic architecture did not merely represent a mistake (as Vasari had suggested), but had developed over time along the lines of a changing society, and was thus a legitimate style in its own right.

== Influences ==
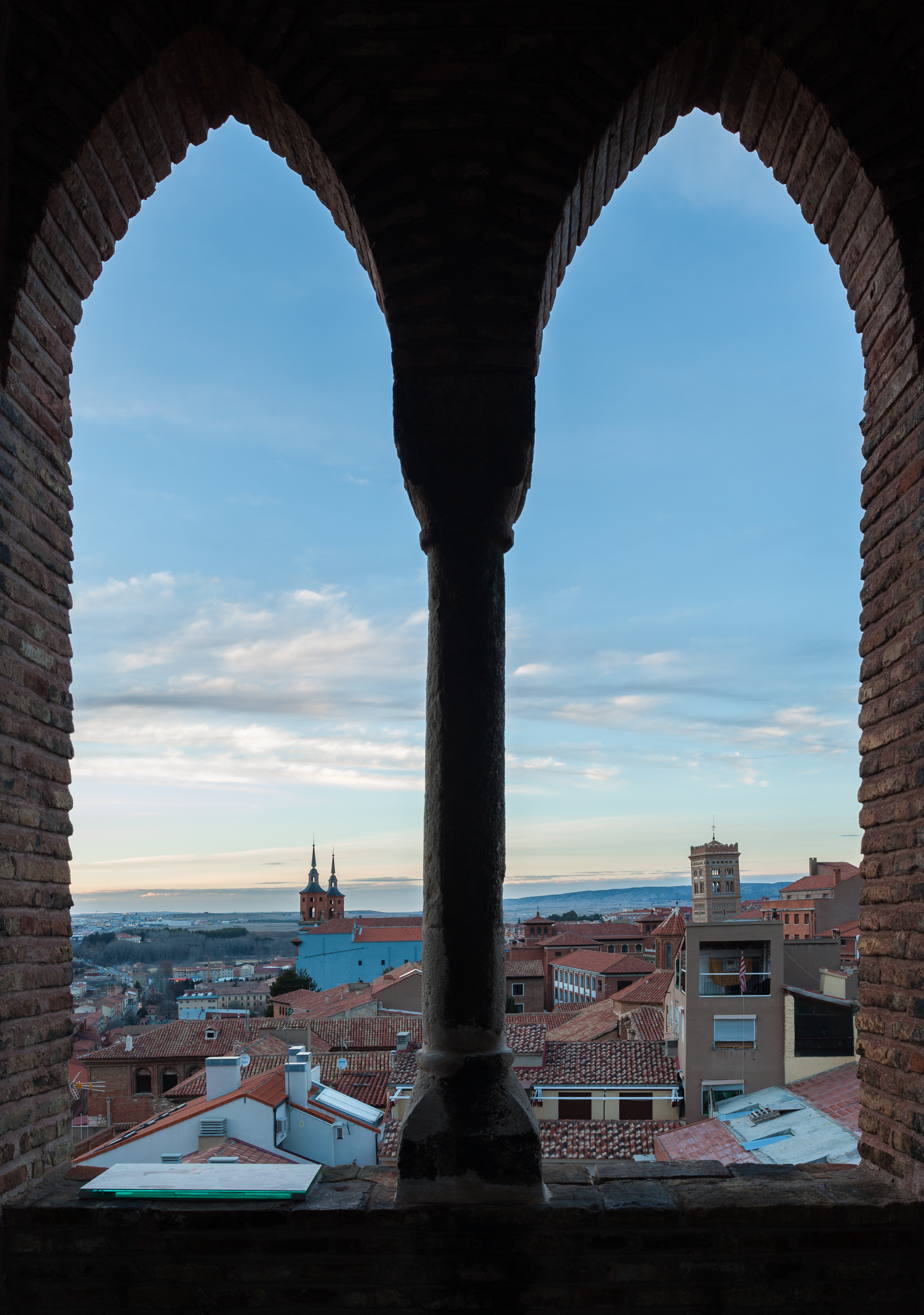
Pointed arches in the 14th-century tower of the church of San Salvador at Teruel in Aragon

The Gothic style of architecture was strongly influenced by the Romanesque architecture from which it evolved, the growing population and wealth of European cities, and the desire to express local grandeur. It was also influenced by theological doctrines, which called for more light, and by technical improvements in vaults and buttresses that allowed much greater height and larger windows. Practical influences included the necessity of many churches, such as Chartres Cathedral and Canterbury Cathedral, to accommodate growing numbers of pilgrims. Influences from Islamic architecture, particularly the pointed arch, have been proposed, with Sicily, Iberia and contact with the eastern Mediterranean suggested as possible routes of transmission, although pointed arches were already employed in Romanesque Europe by the late eleventh century. Pointed arches and flying buttresses are also documented in earlier Byzantine architecture. Gothic architecture as a distinct architectural system developed in northern France in the twelfth century from preceding Romanesque building traditions.

=== Romanesque influence ===
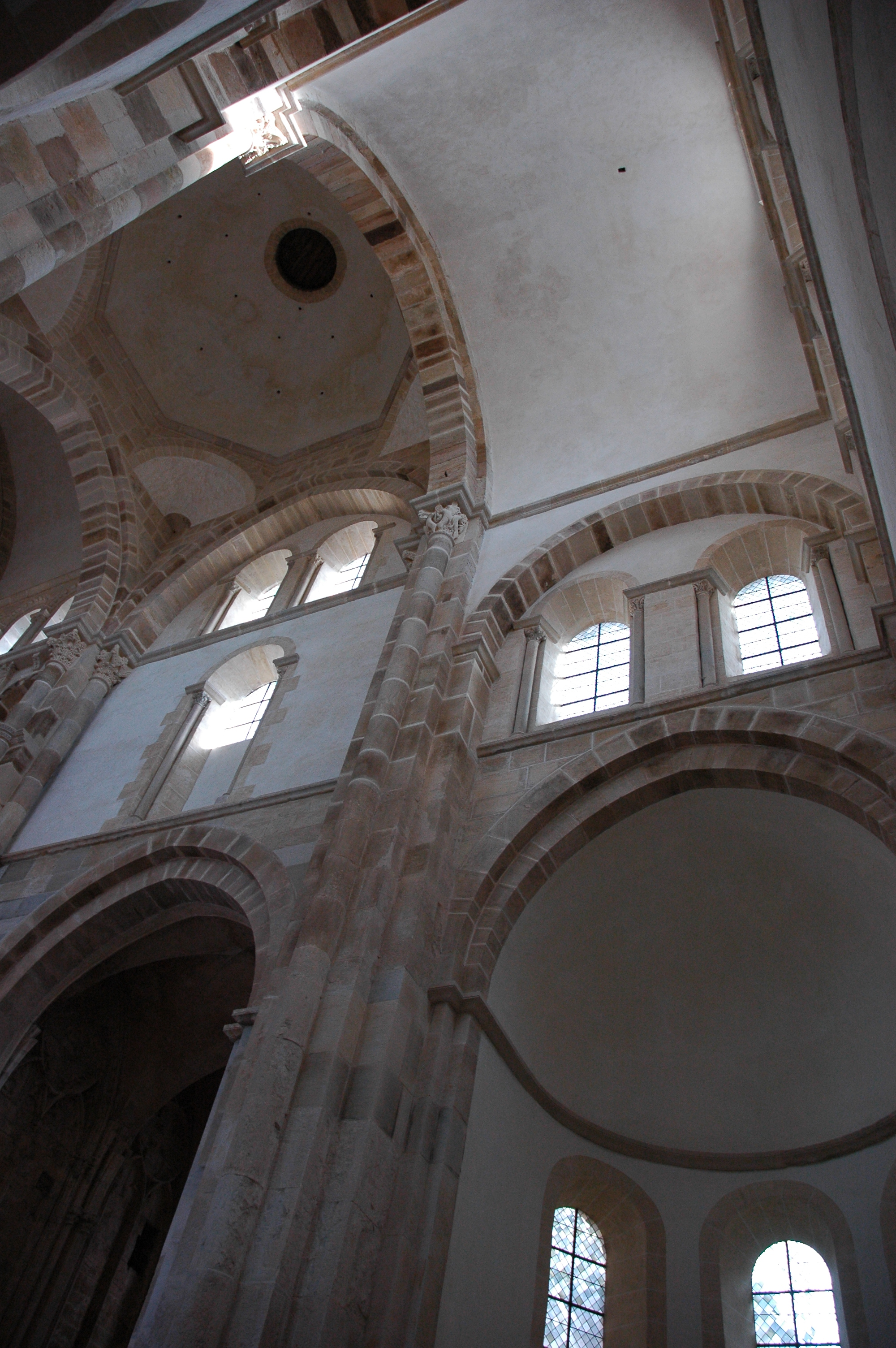
Pointed arches and vaults in Cluny Abbey (begun 1089)

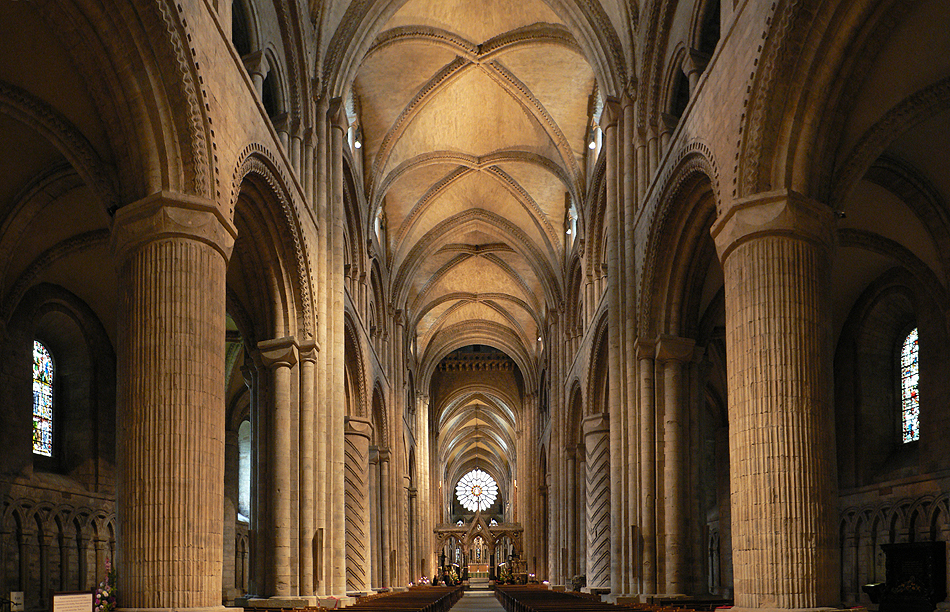
Rointed rib vaults in the nave of Durham Cathedral in England (1093–c.1130).

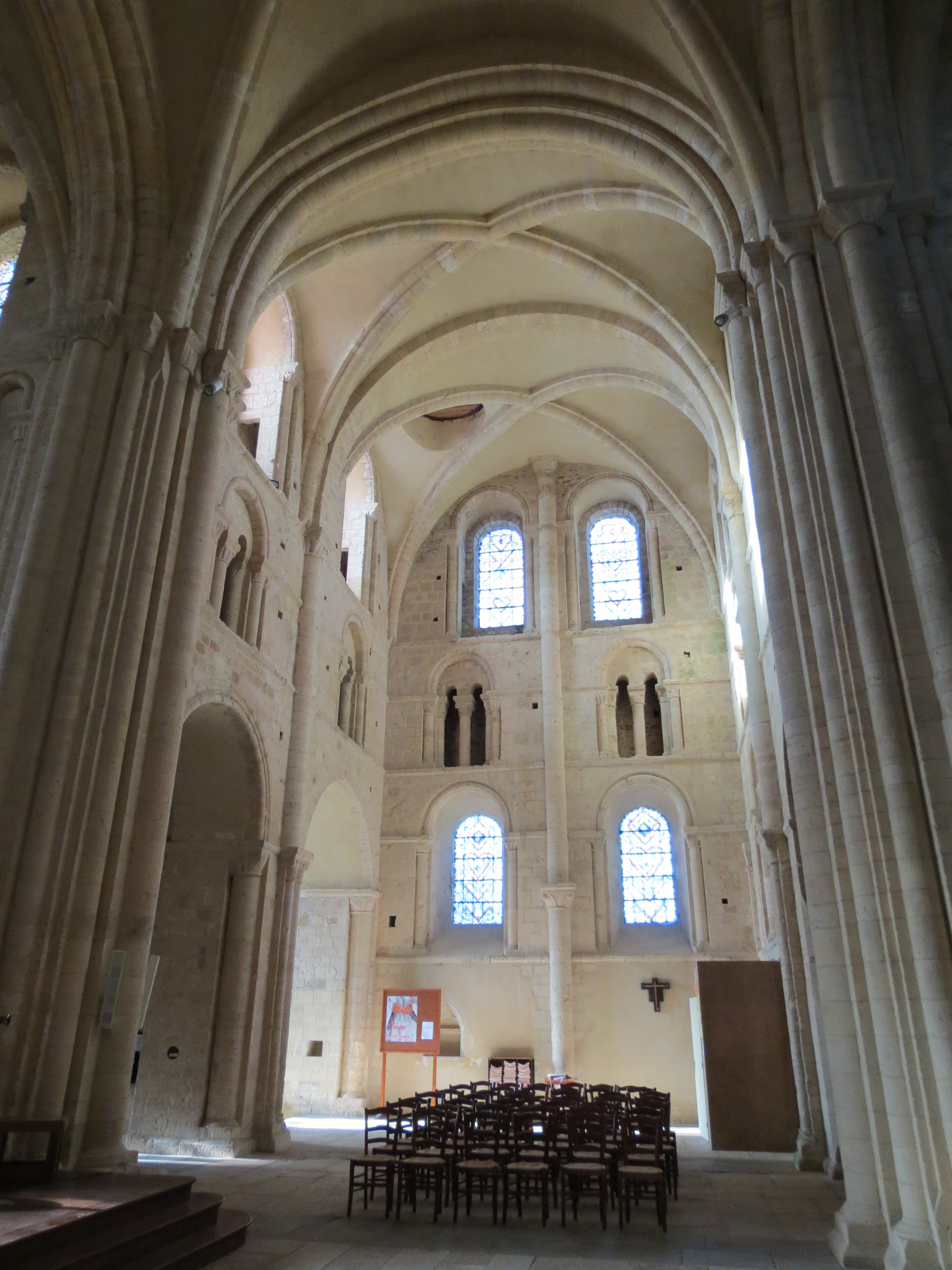
The south transept of Lessay Abbey in Normandy (1064–1178)

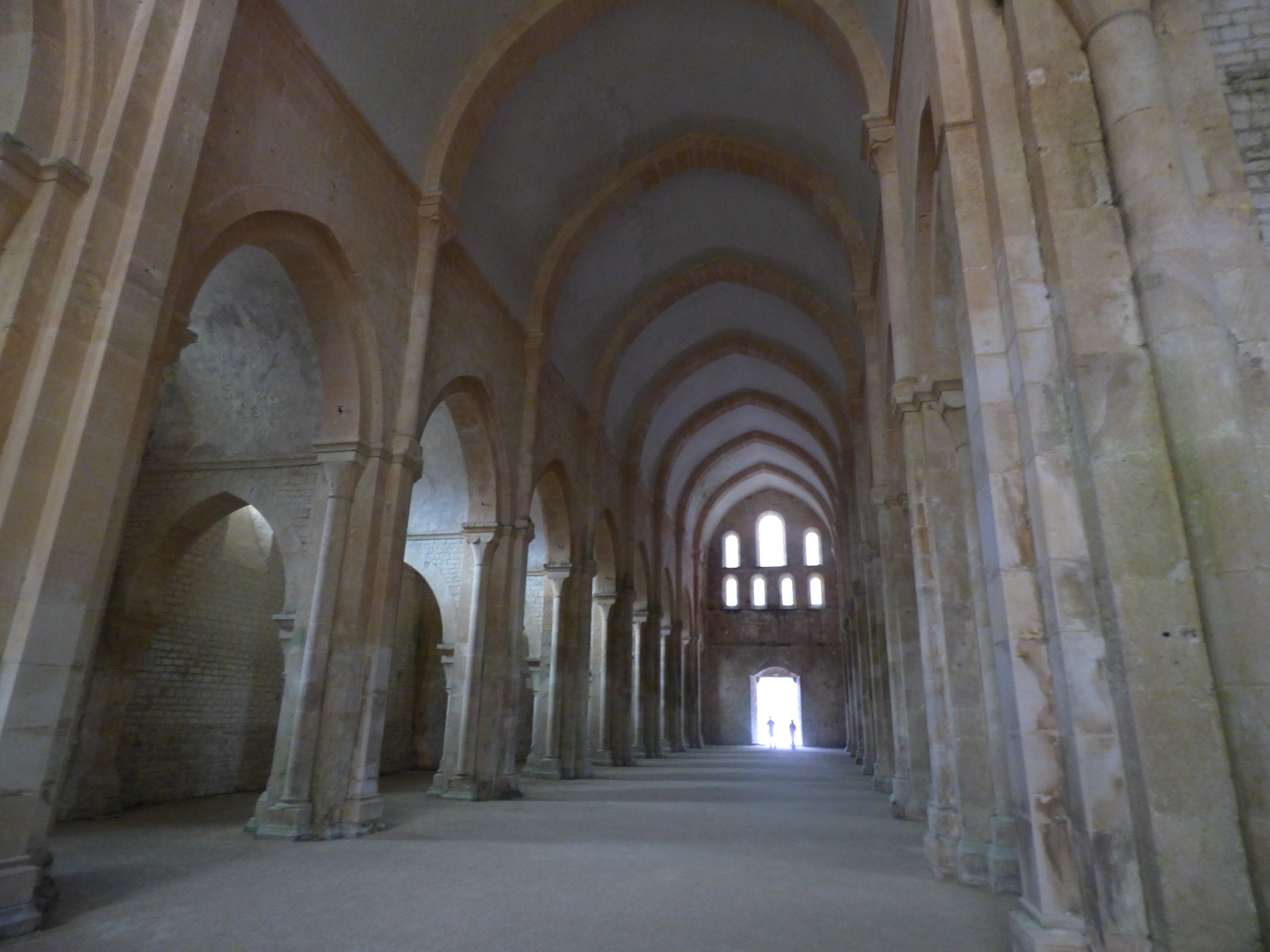
Pointed arches and barrel vaults in the Cistercian church of Fontenay Abbey

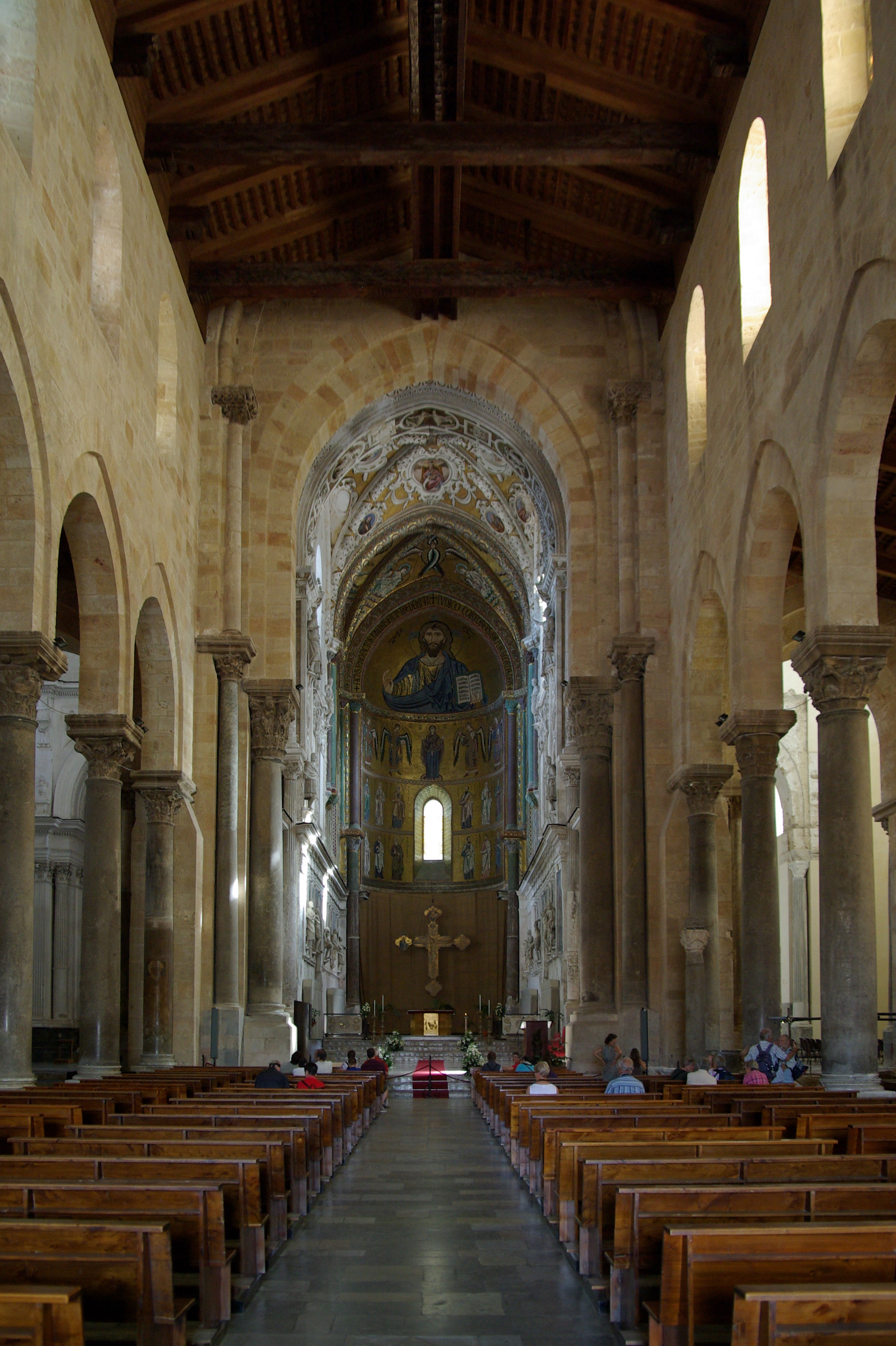
Cefalù Cathedral, Sicily (1131–1267)

Romanesque architecture had a major influence upon Gothic architecture, encompassing much the same geographic area. The plan of the Gothic cathedral was based upon the plan of the ancient Roman basilica, which was adopted by Romanesque architecture. The Latin cross plan, with a nave and transept, choir, ambulatory, and radiating chapels, came from the Romanesque model. The common three-storey elevation of arcade, triforium and clerestory was also a continuation from Romanesque architecture. When churches were vaulted, Romanesque masons used round barrel vaults, and groin vaults when two barrel vaults met at right angles. Rib vaults began to be used in the late 11th century, in England and Normandy. One of the first high rib vaults was in the Norman Durham Cathedral (begun 1093). The earlier vaults in the transepts have rounded arches, while the nave vaults use pointed arches. However, the quadrant arches in the aisles at Durham, often held to be early flying buttresses, in fact have no role in abutting the high vault, instead carrying the aisle roofs. Lessay Abbey in Normandy also has early rib vaults, of a similar date to Durham's. Cefalù Cathedral (1131–1267) in Sicily, built by the Normans, combines pointed arches and large rib vaults with mosaic decoration. Several Romanesque churches had walls pierced by galleries and wide windows, in the manner later praised by Abbot Suger at Saint-Denis, such as Anselm's choir at Canterbury Cathedral and Reading Abbey.

=== Byzantine and Islamic influence ===
The pointed arch or near-pointed arches and forms of external buttressing akin to flying buttresses were occasionally used in Late Roman and Byzantine architecture. A sixth-century Byzantine example is the apse arch of the Basilica of Sant'Apollinare in Classe at Ravenna, though the point on this arch is very slight and may not have been deliberate. Pointed arches, pointed groin vaults and flying-buttress-like structures were used in Byzantine baths, aqueducts and cisterns on Cyprus, for instance at the Chytroi-Constantia Aqueduct (dated to 631 AD) serving the city of Constantia. However, these were isolated uses of the pointed arch in a round-arched architectural tradition, and were generally restricted to utilitarian functions rather than being a major aesthetic feature. Pointed and parabolic arches were also used in Sasanian architecture.

Islamic architecture subsequently made extensive use of the pointed arch, particularly after the late Umayyad and early Abbasid periods (i.e. the eighth century). The innovation of Islamic architecture was to use the pointed arch as an aesthetic device; it has been suggested that this was in rejection of the semicircular arches of existing Christian architecture, for instance when accompanied by anti-trinity calligraphy at the Dome of the Rock. The pointed arch was used consistently in structures across much of the Islamic world, such as Al-Ukhaidir Fortress (Iraq, 775 AD) and the Mosque of Ibn Tulun (Cairo, 879 AD). Some scholars have proposed that contact with Islamic architecture in Iberia, Sicily and the eastern Mediterranean contributed to the adoption of the pointed arch in medieval Western Europe, though the extent of such influence is debated. The military and cultural contacts with the medieval Islamic world, including the Norman conquest of Islamic Sicily in 1090, the Crusades (beginning 1095), and the Islamic presence in Spain, may have influenced Medieval Europe's adoption of the pointed arch.

The pointed arch was already established in Romanesque architecture by the late eleventh and early twelfth centuries; Kenneth Conant and Jean Bony identified its use at Cluny Abbey (begun 1089), and attributed its spread in part to its structural advantages. Cluny was the most important monastery in Europe, with the largest church at that time, and a network of subordinate monasteries in the Cluniac Order, so it was natural that any innovations there would have a wide impact. Aside from the pointed arches, there are other features more explicitly derived from Islamic architecture at Cluny, such as horseshoe arches in the triforium. Possible Islamic influence at Cluny raises chronological challenges: the abbey church predates both the First Crusade and many of the Norman-Arab-Byzantine churches with pointed arches in Sicily, and Moorish architecture in Spain generally used horseshoe arches rather than pointed ones. Conant suggested Amalfi and Monte Cassino as possible points of contact, though this interpretation is not universally accepted.

Another feature of Gothic architecture, a kind of rib vault, had also earlier appeared in Islamic architecture, and spread to Western Europe via Islamic Spain and Sicily. Intersecting-rib domes were also constructed in medieval Islamic architecture, including at the Mosque–Cathedral of Córdoba. Their ribs, however, differed in construction and structural function from the structural rib vaults characteristic of Gothic architecture. Particular forms of intersecting-rib domes were subsequently adopted in parts of Romanesque and Gothic Europe through contacts with Islamic Spain and Sicily. This direct contact also produced buildings combining Romanesque or Gothic construction with Islamic decorative forms.

Similarities have also been observed between early medieval Armenian buildings (such as the Cathedral of Ani) and Gothic churches, including pointed arches and clustered piers. However, Armenian architecture is not widely considered to be a major influence on Gothic architecture. The proposed “proto-Gothic” character of the ogival arches of the cathedral of Ani has also been questioned, as these arches do not serve the same function in supporting the vault.

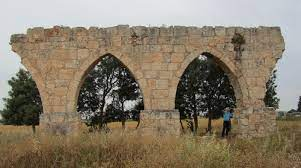
The Byzantine Chytroi-Constantia Aqueduct, Cyprus

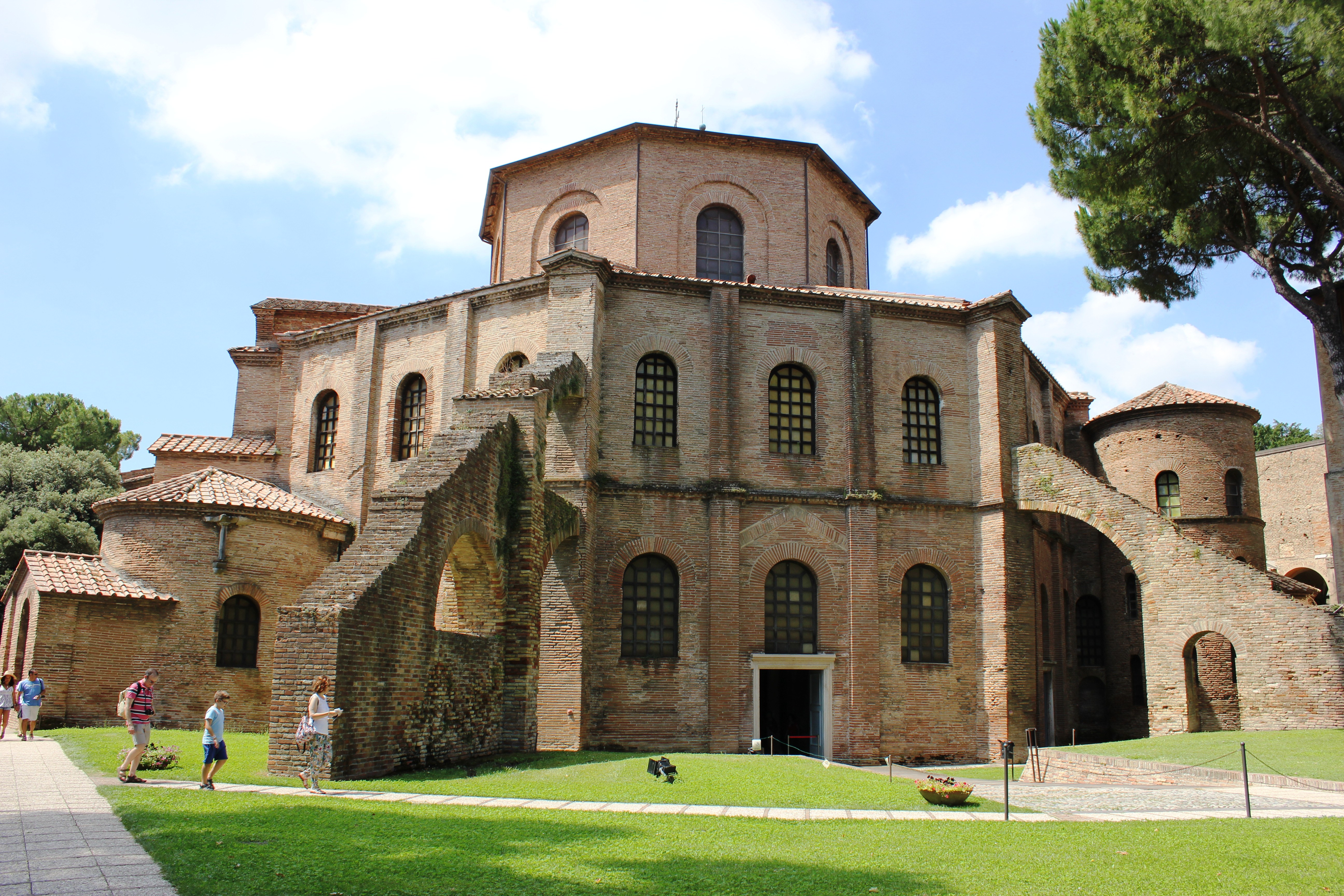
Flying buttresses on San Vitale, Ravenna (pre-12th century)

Pointed arches within the Dome of the Rock (691 AD)

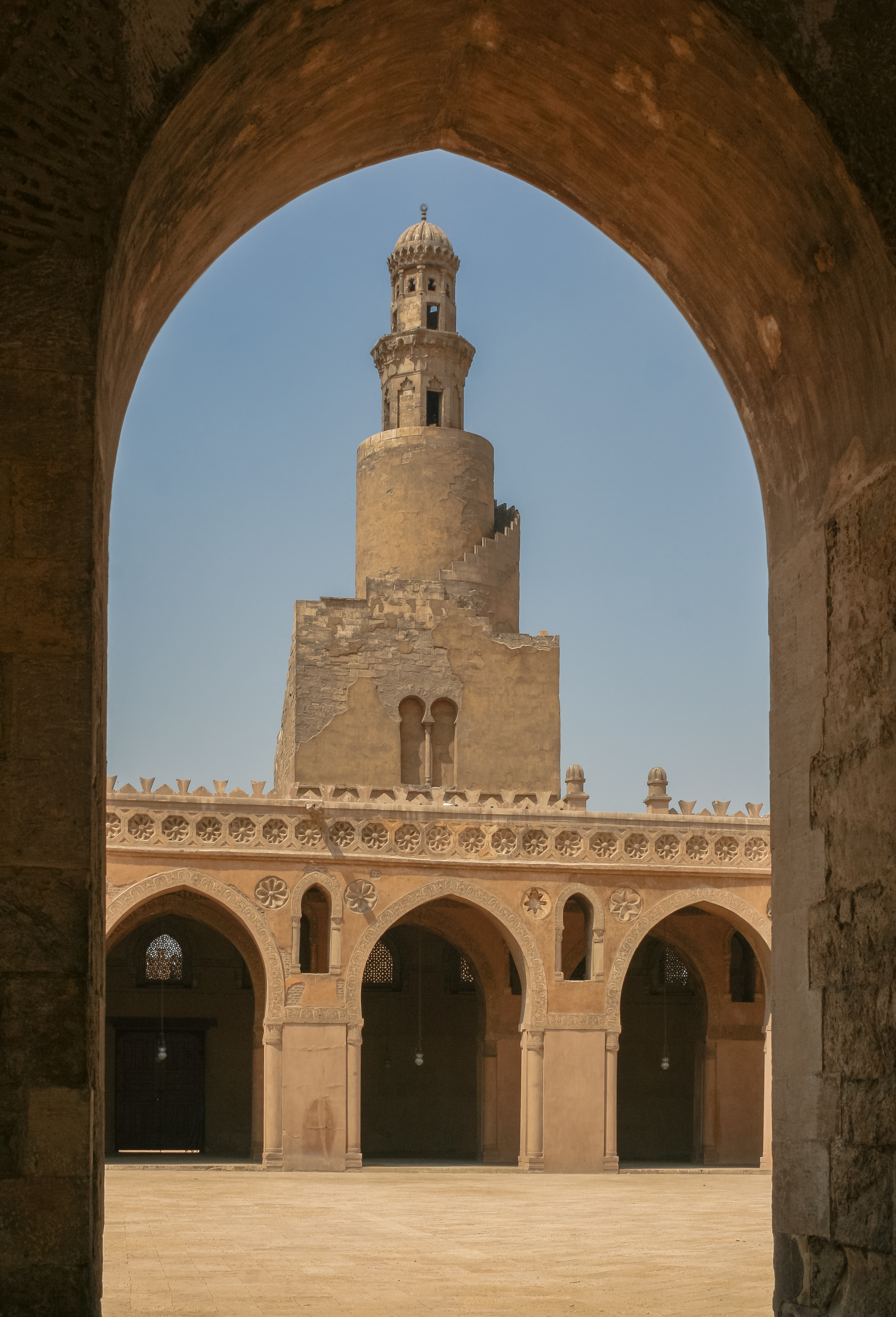
Ibn Tulun Mosque, Cairo (879 AD)

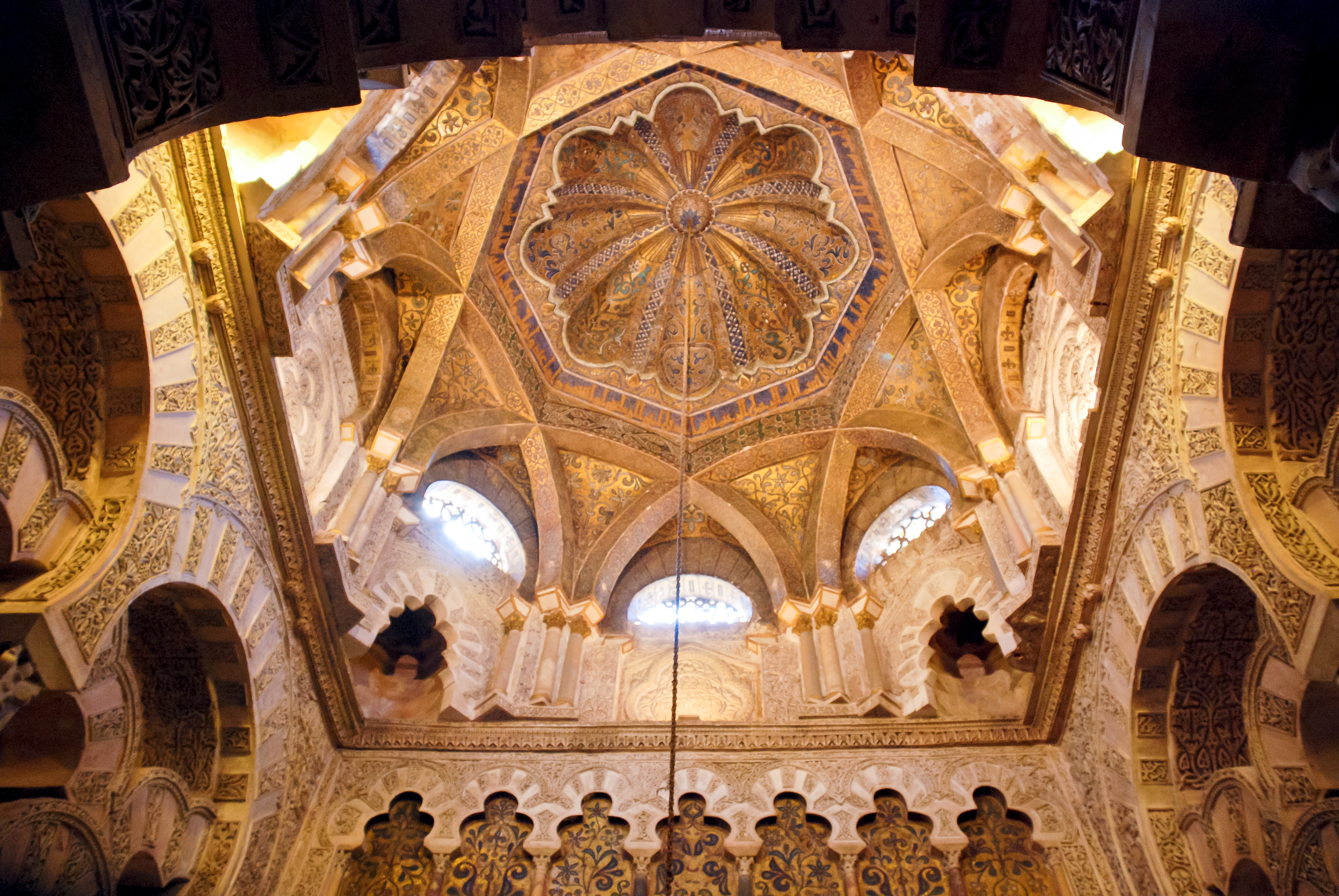
Dome and multifoiled arches of Cordoba Mosque-Cathedral, Spain (784–987 AD).

== Periods ==
Gothic architecture began in the earlier 12th century near Paris and spread throughout Catholic Europe in the 12th and 13th centuries. By 1300, a first "International Style" of Gothic had developed, with common design features and formal language. A second "international style" emerged by 1400, alongside innovations in England and central Europe that produced both the Perpendicular and Flamboyant varieties. Typically, these typologies are identified as:

- c. 1140 – c. 1190 Early Gothic (referred to in France as Primary Gothic; it overlapped with Romanesque in Transitional or Romano-Gothic styles)
- c. 1190 – c. 1240 High Gothic (referred to in France as Classic Gothic) and Early English
- c. 1240 – c.1350 Rayonnant and Decorated (the latter in England only)
- c. 1350 – c. 1500 Late Gothic: Flamboyant (influencing styles including Sondergotik, Isabelline and Manueline) and Perpendicular (in England only)
- c. 16th–18th century Gothic Survival
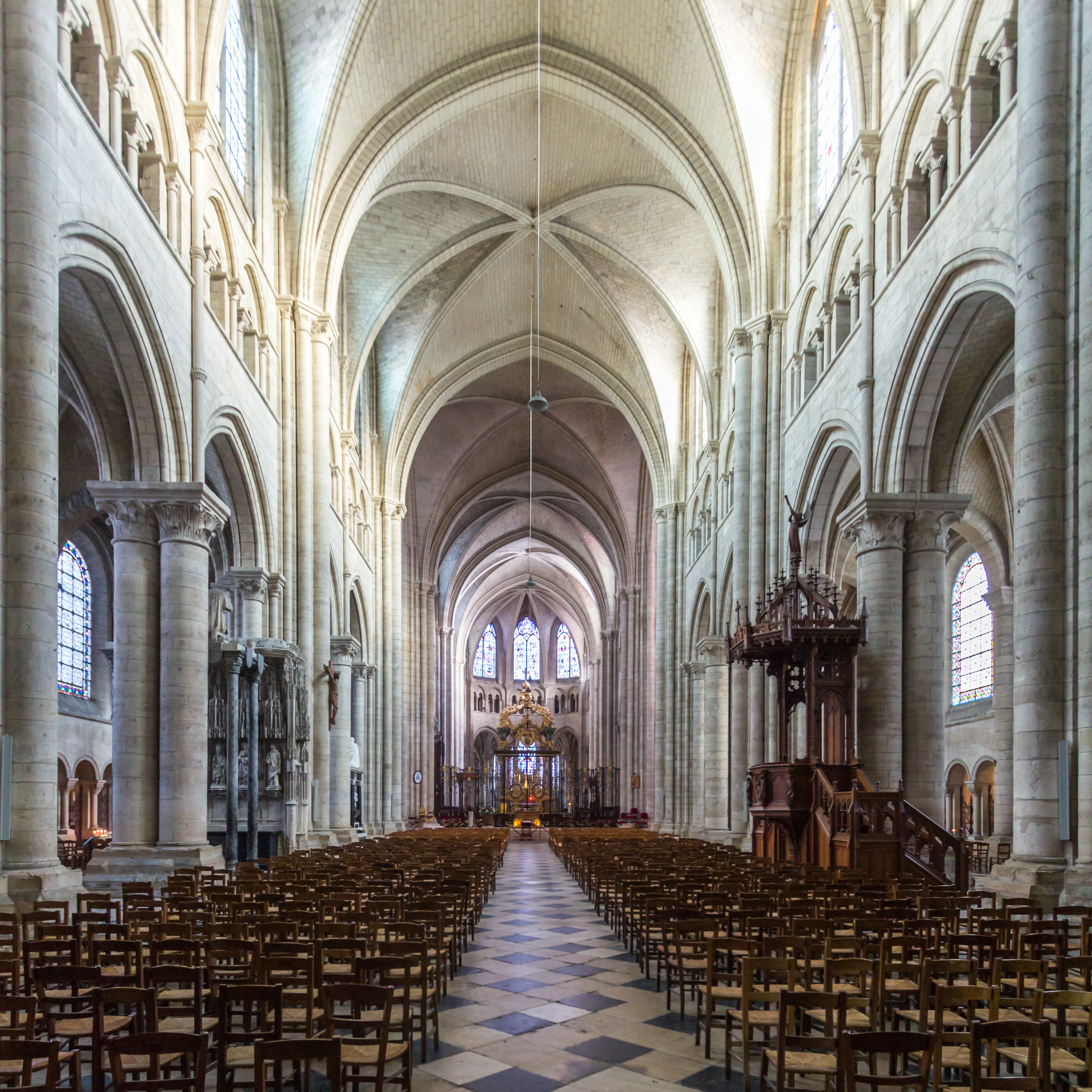
Early Gothic: nave of Sens Cathedral (1135–1176)

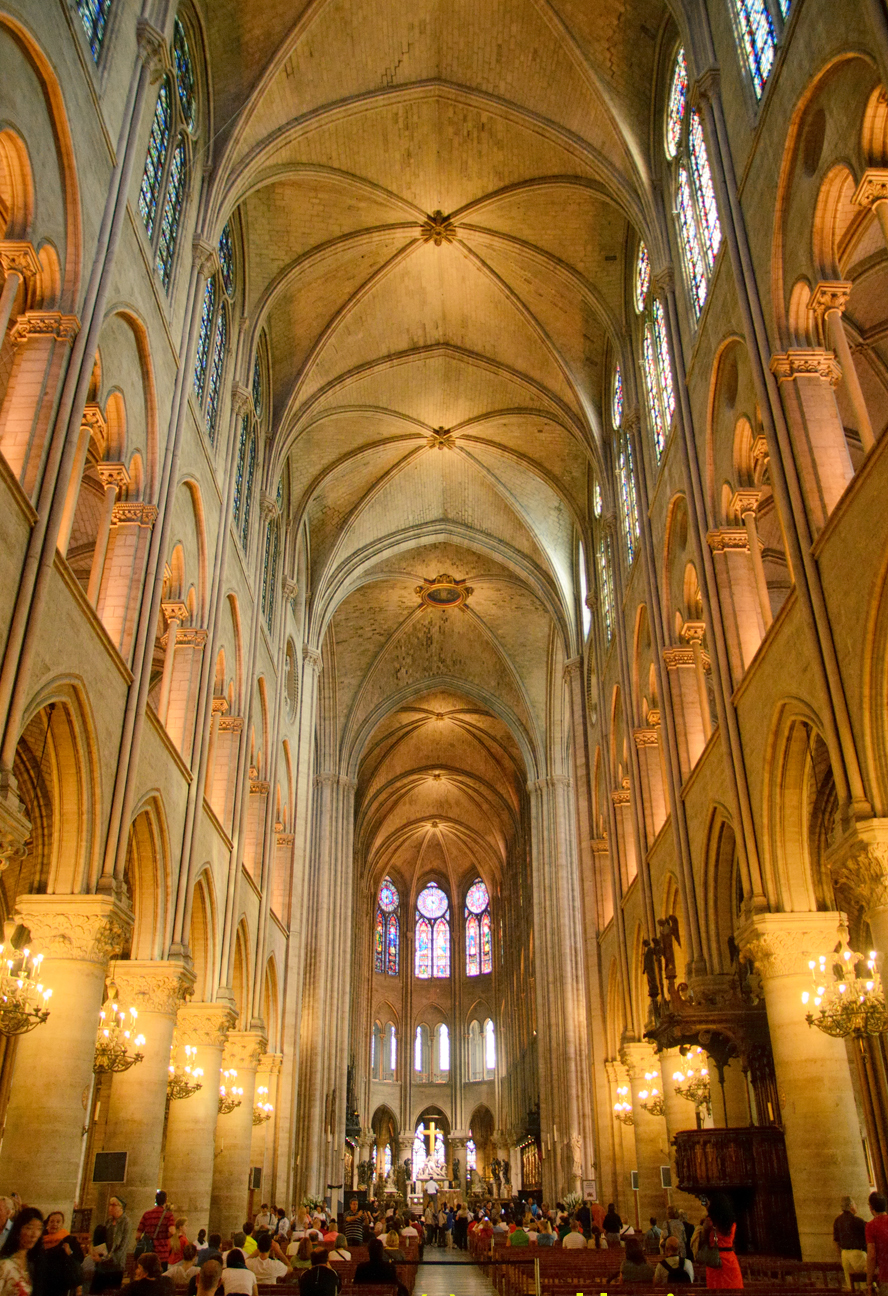
Early Gothic; nave of Notre-Dame de Paris (1185–1200)

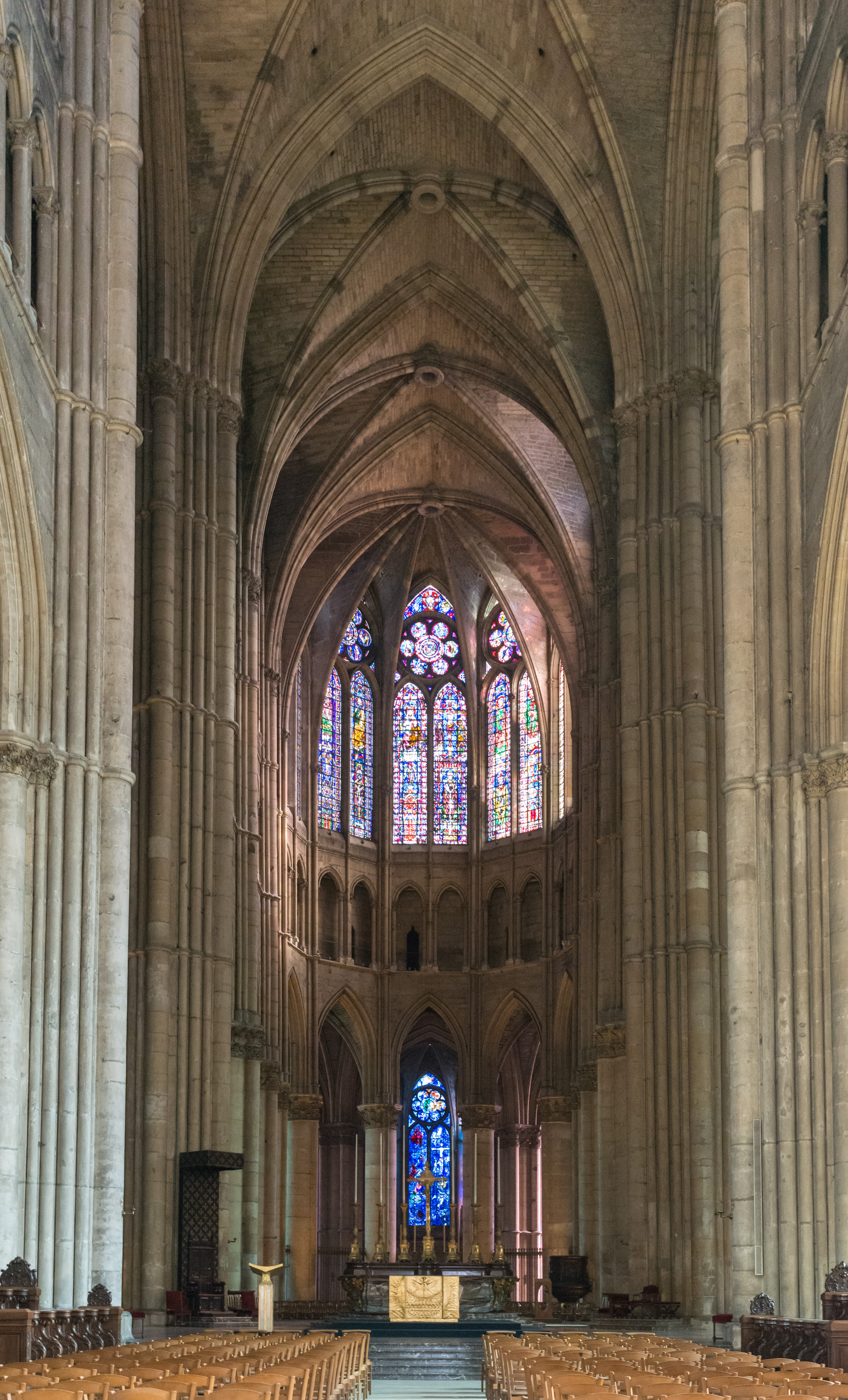
High Gothic: choir of Reims Cathedral (1211-1299)

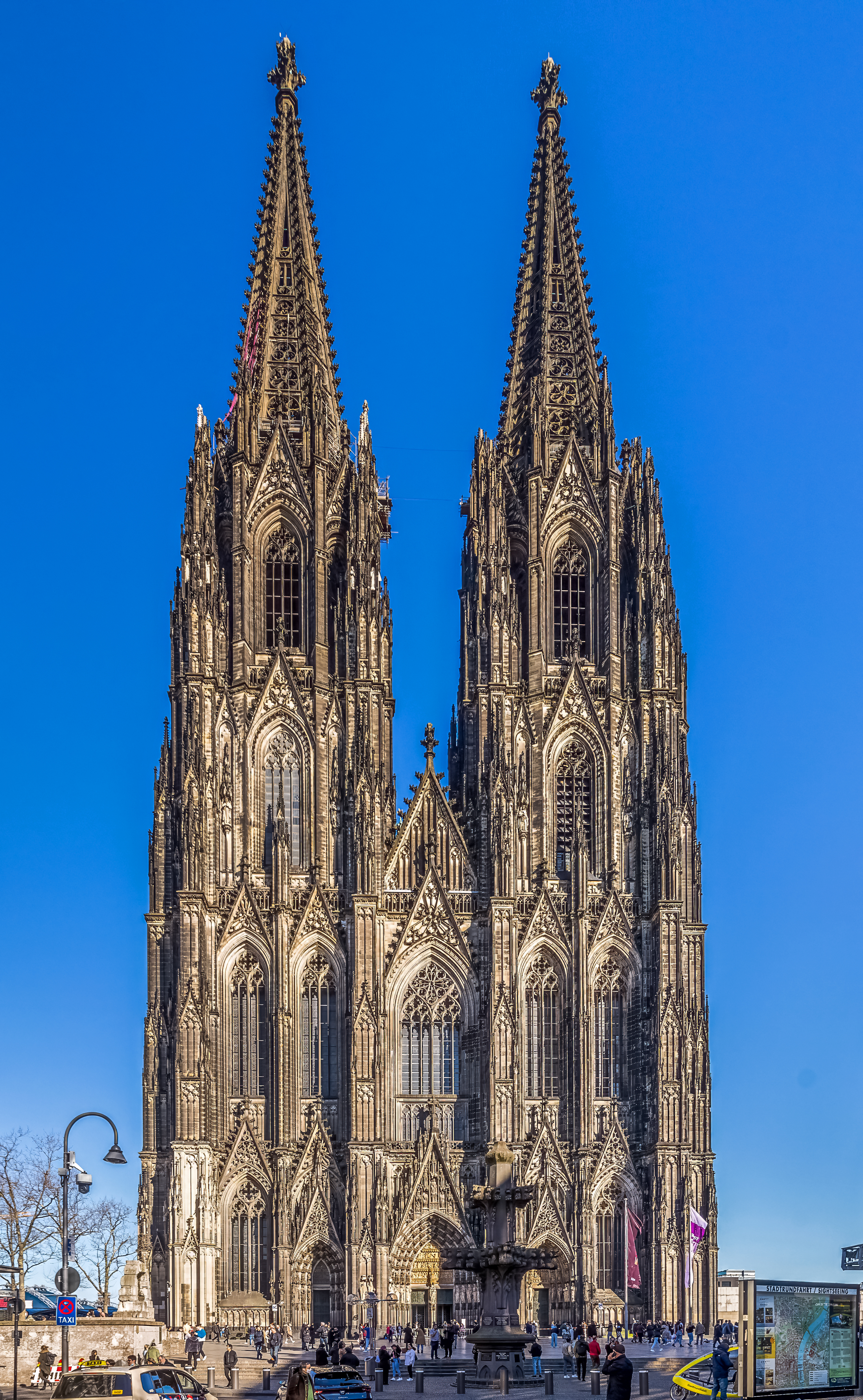
High Gothic: Cologne Cathedral (1248–1880)

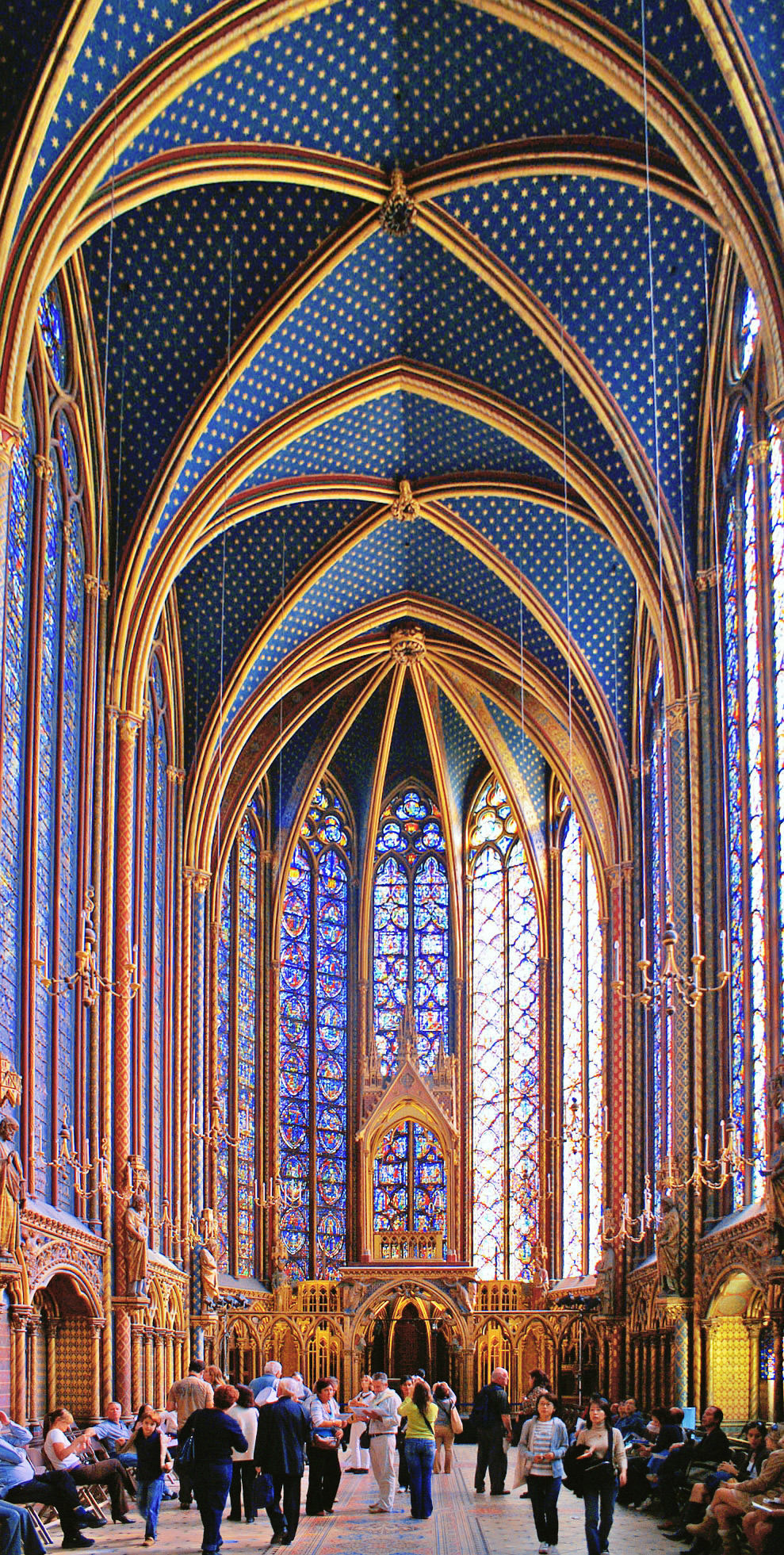
Rayonnant: Sainte-Chapelle upper level (1238–1248)

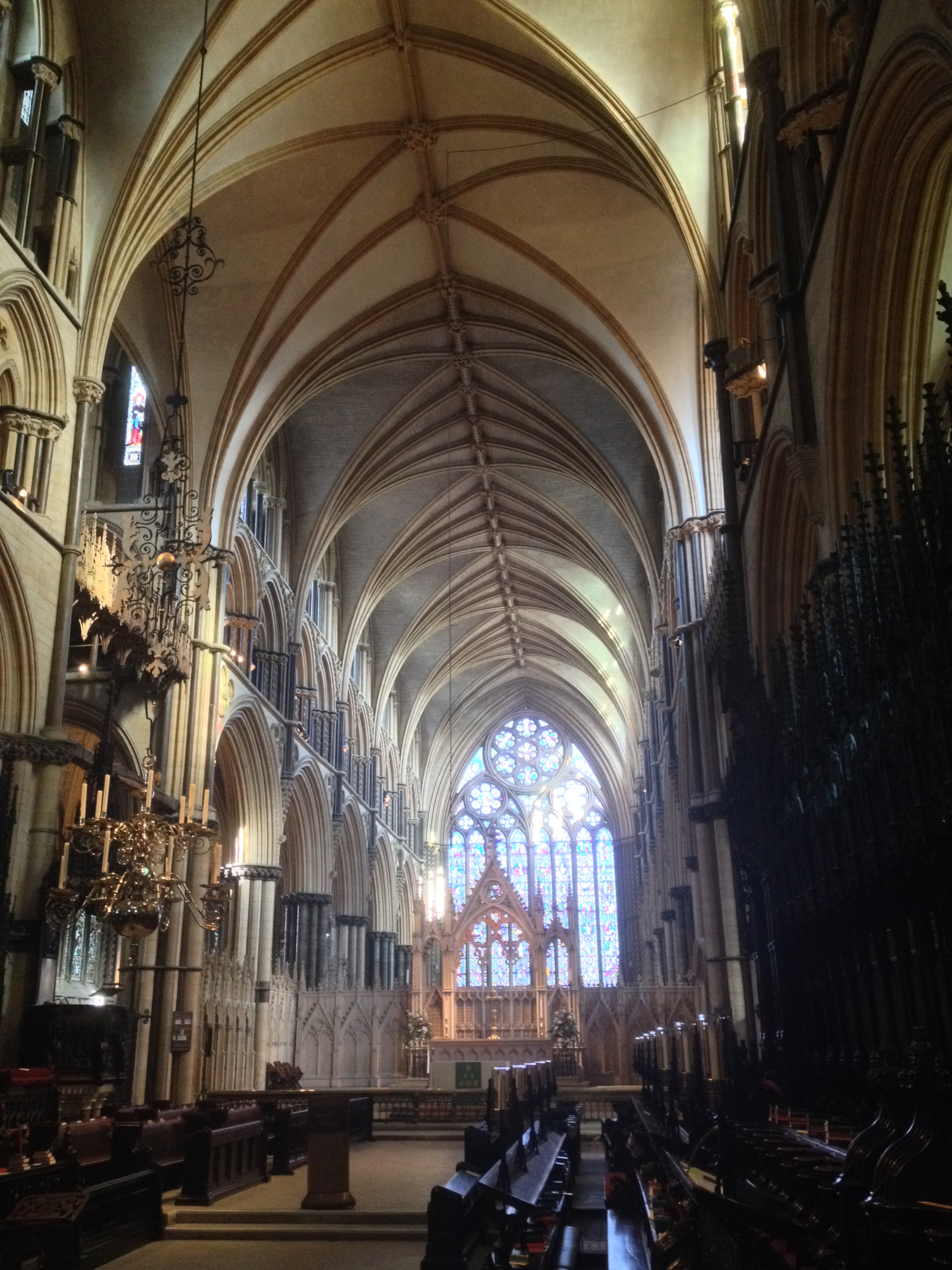
Decorated: Angel Choir of Lincoln Cathedral (1258–80)

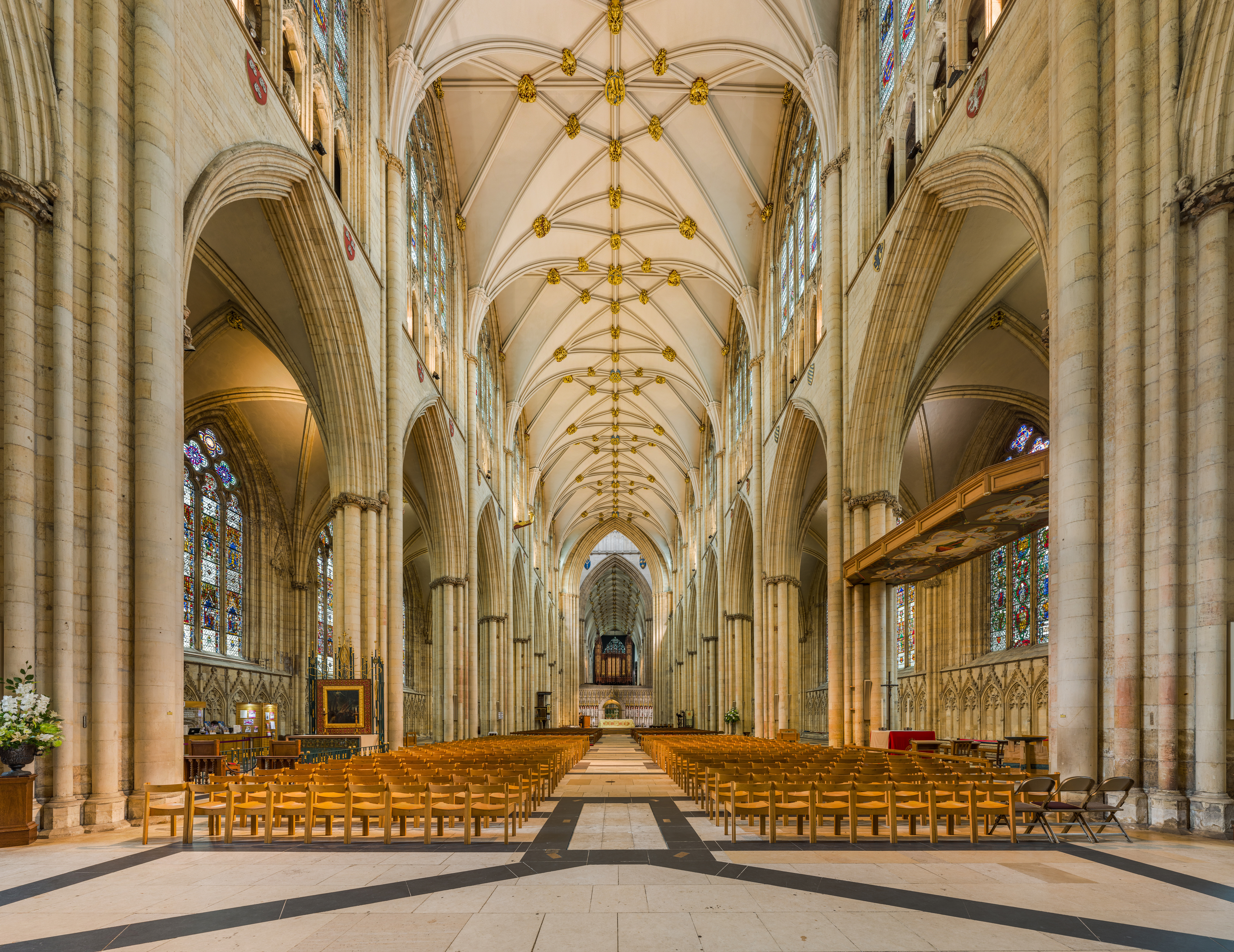
Perpendicular: choir of York Minister (1361–1405)

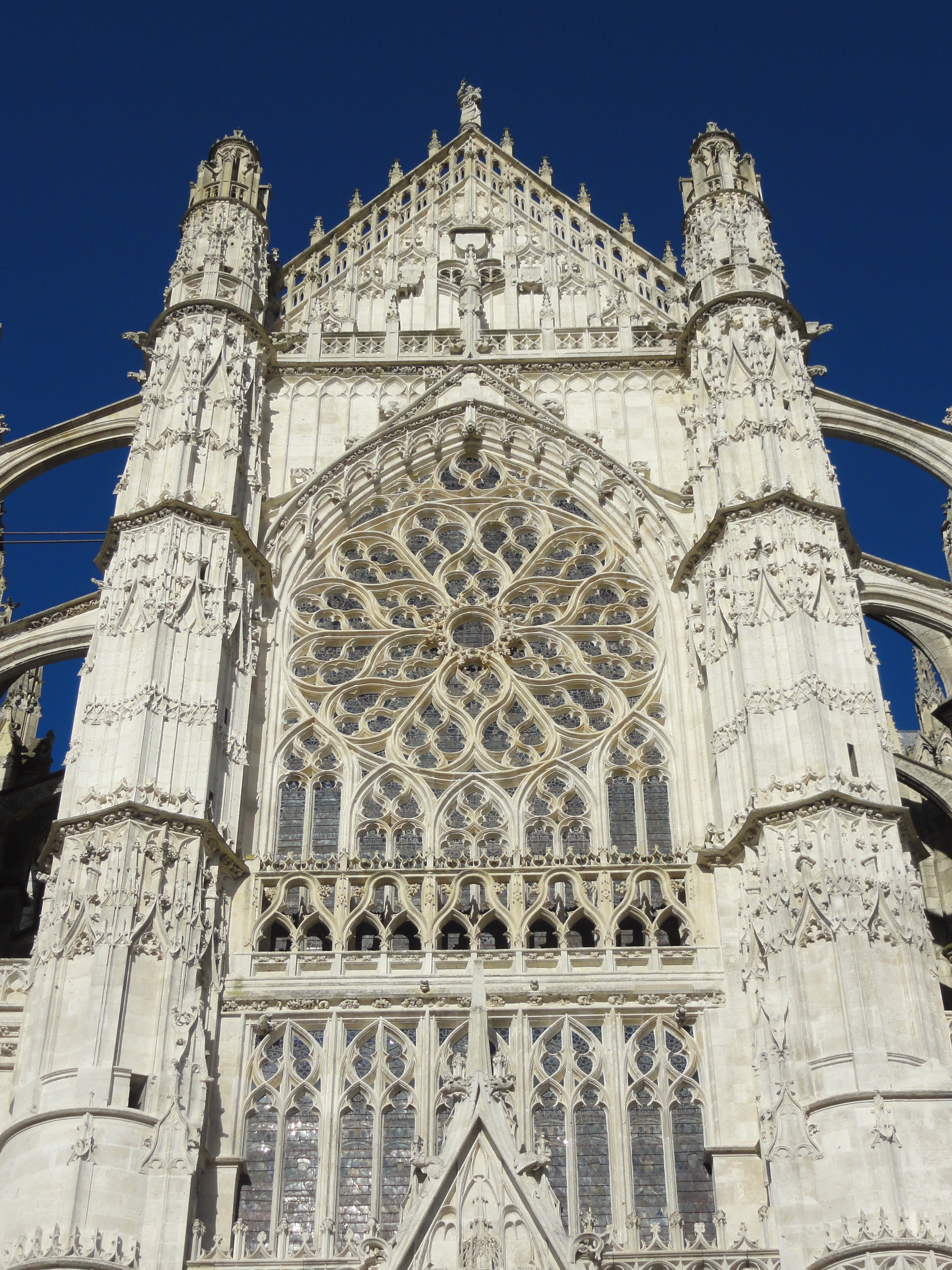
Flamboyant: south transept of Beauvais Cathedral (1499)

== History ==
=== Early Gothic ===
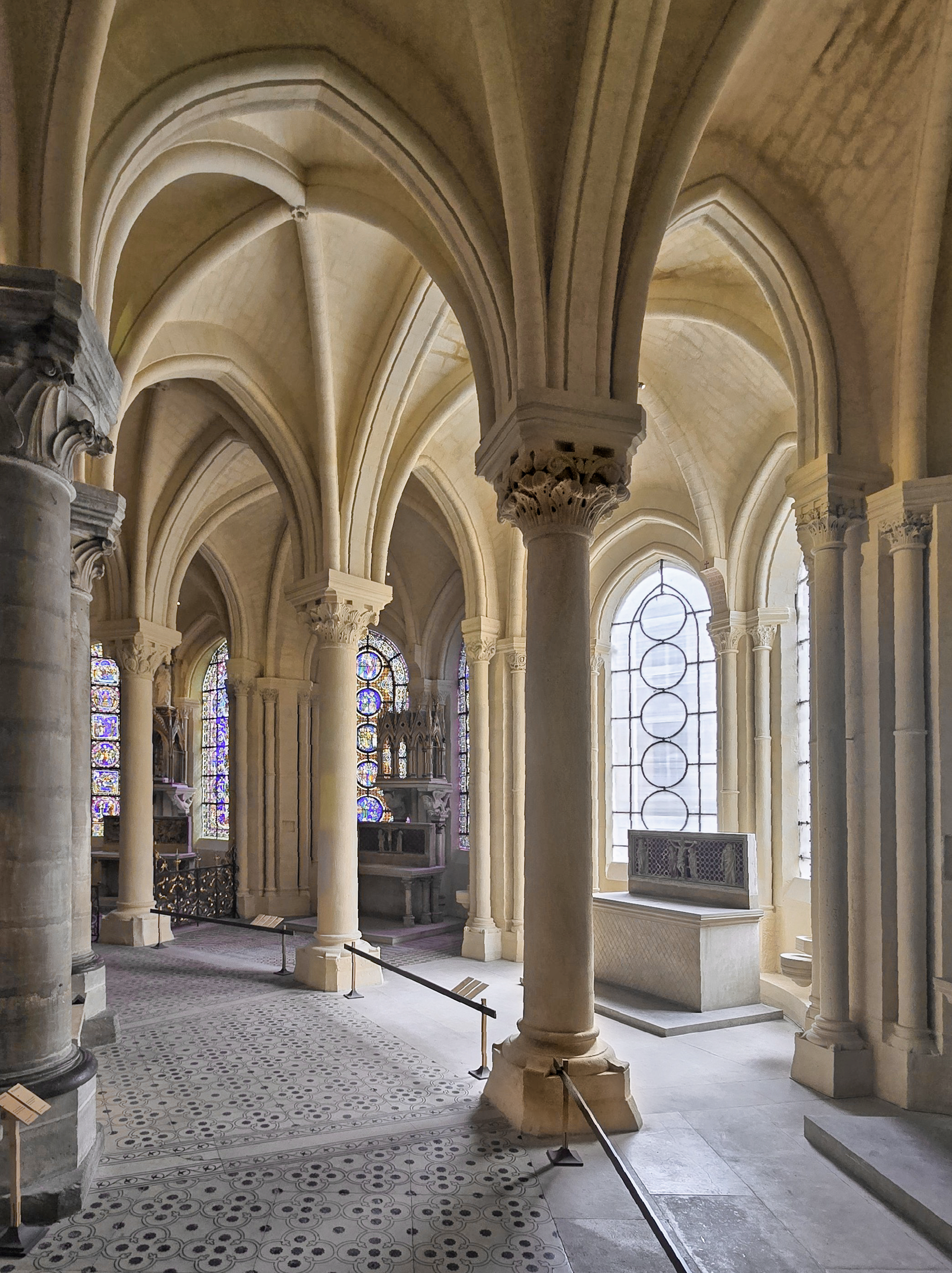
Early Gothic ambulatory, Basilica of Saint-Denis (1140-44).

Romanesque architecture on either side of the English Channel developed in parallel towards Early Gothic. Gothic features, such as the rib vault, had appeared in England, Sicily and Normandy in the 11th century. Rib-vaults were employed in some parts of the cathedral at Durham (1093–1133) and in Lessay Abbey in Normandy (1098). However, the first buildings to be considered fully Gothic are the royal funerary abbey of the French kings, the Abbey of Saint-Denis (1135–1144), and the archiepiscopal cathedral at Sens (1135–1164). They were the first buildings to systematically combine rib vaulting, buttresses, and pointed arches.

Saint-Denis was the work of the Abbot Suger, a close adviser of Kings Louis VI and Louis VII. Suger reconstructed portions of the old Romanesque church with rib vaults in order to increase the size of the stained glass windows. He described the new ambulatory as "a circular ring of chapels, by virtue of which the whole church would shine with the wonderful and uninterrupted light of most luminous windows, pervading the interior beauty." To support the vaults he also introduced columns with capitals of carved vegetal designs, modelled upon the classical columns he had seen in Rome. In addition, he installed a circular rose window over the portal on the façade. These also became a common feature of Gothic cathedrals. French Gothic churches were heavily influenced both by the ambulatory and side-chapels around the choir at Saint-Denis, and by the paired towers and triple doors on the western façade.

The first cathedral built entirely in the new style was Sens Cathedral, begun between 1135 and 1140 and consecrated in 1160. It has six-part rib vaults, alternating pillars and paired columns, and buttresses to offset the outward thrust from the vaults. Sens was influential in its strongly vertical appearance and in its three-part elevation, typical of subsequent Gothic buildings, with a clerestory at the top supported by a triforium, all carried on high arcades of pointed arches. In the following decades flying buttresses began to be used, allowing the construction of lighter, higher walls.

Sens was quickly followed by Senlis Cathedral (begun 1160), and Notre-Dame de Paris (begun 1160). Their builders abandoned the traditional plans and introduced the new Gothic elements from Saint-Denis. The builders of Notre-Dame went further by introducing the flying buttress, heavy columns of support outside the walls connected by arches to the upper walls. The buttresses counterbalanced the outward thrust from the rib vaults. This allowed the builders to construct higher, thinner walls and larger windows.

=== Early English and High Gothic ===
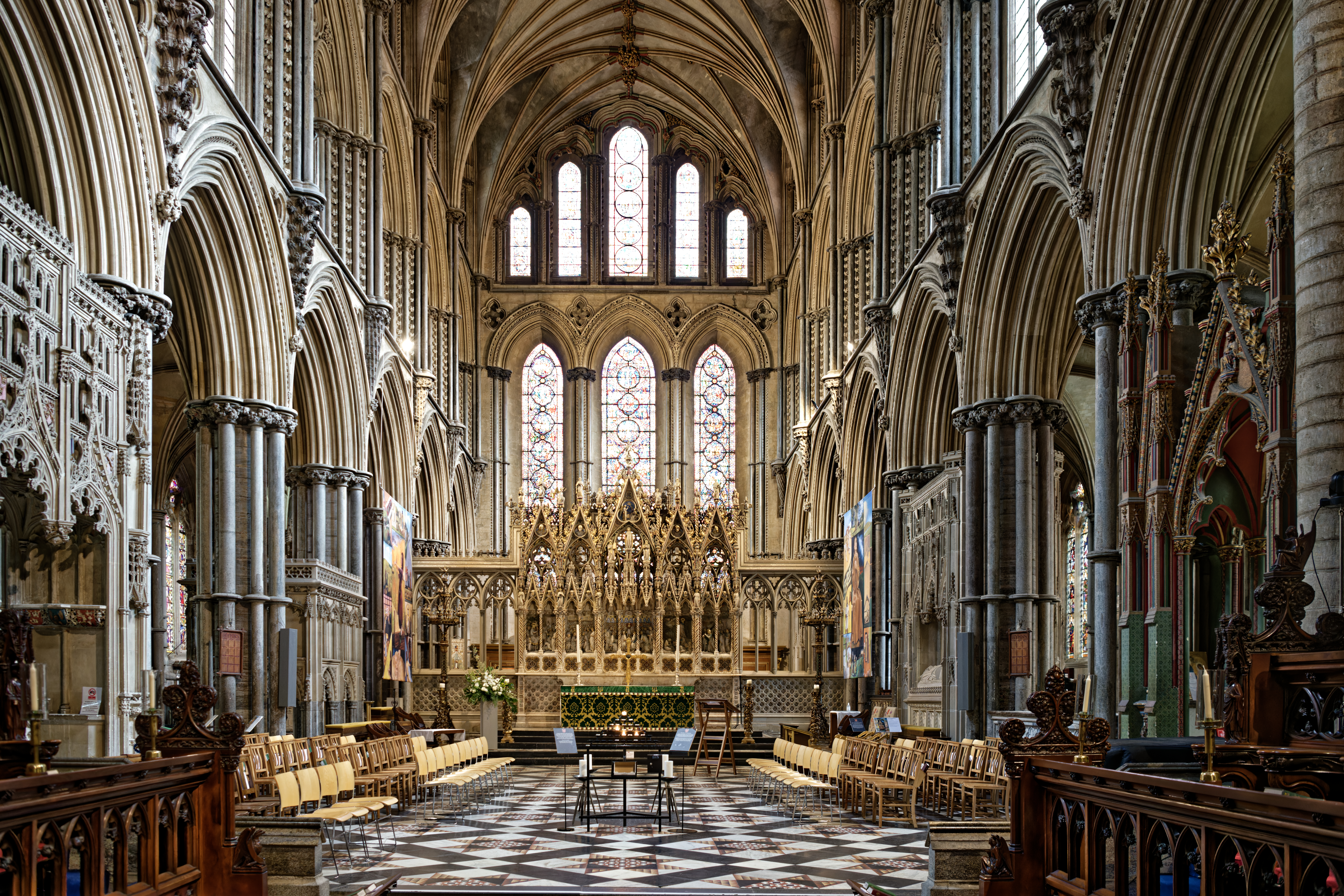
Early English; presbytery of Ely Cathedral

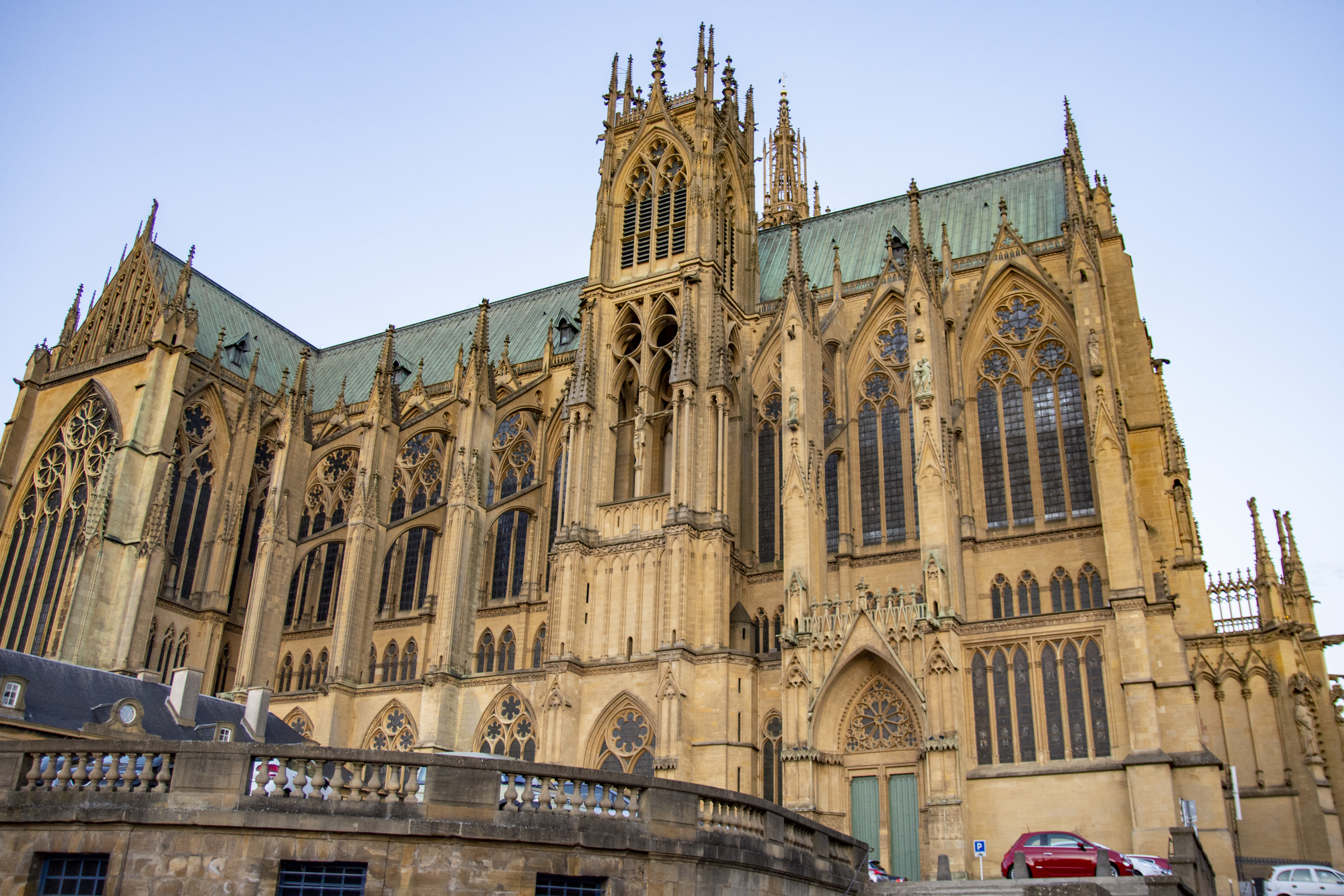
High Gothic flying buttresses, Metz Cathedral (1220–1550)

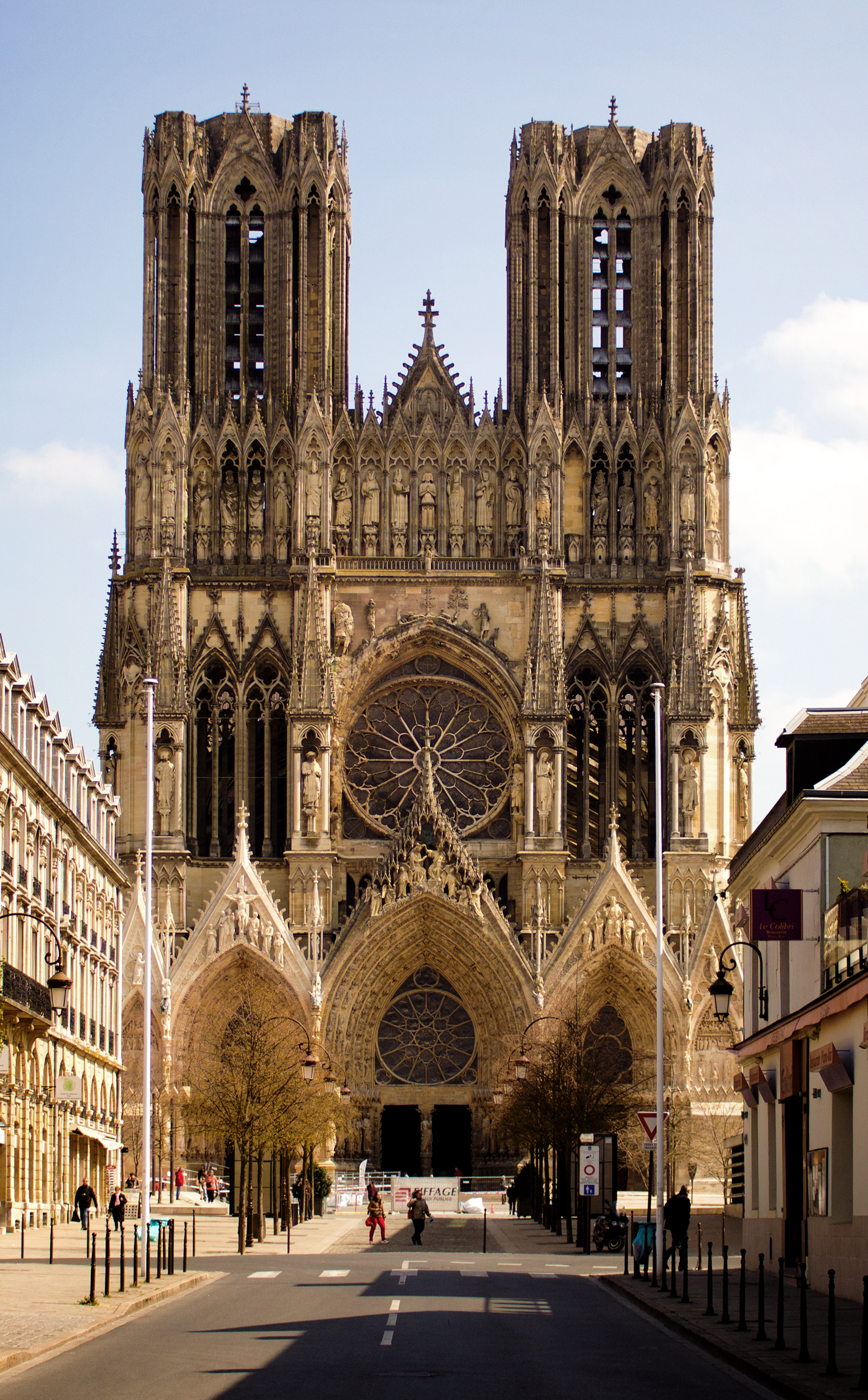
High Gothic west front, Reims Cathedral (1211–1345)

Following the destruction by fire of the choir of Canterbury Cathedral in 1174, a group of master builders was invited to propose plans for the reconstruction. The master-builder William of Sens, who had worked on Sens Cathedral, won the competition. Work began that same year, but in 1178 William was badly injured by falling from the scaffolding, and returned to France, where he died. His work was continued by William the Englishman who replaced his French namesake in 1178. The resulting structure of the choir of Canterbury Cathedral is considered the first work of Early English Gothic. The cathedral churches of Worcester (1175–), Wells (c.1180–), Lincoln (1192–), and Salisbury (1220–) are all, with Canterbury, major examples. Tiercerons – decorative vaulting ribs – seem first to have been used in vaulting at Lincoln Cathedral, installed c.1200. Instead of a triforium, Early English churches usually retained a gallery.

High Gothic (c. 1194–1250) was a brief but very productive period, which produced some of the great landmarks of Gothic art. The first building in the High Gothic (referred to as Classic Gothic in France) was Chartres Cathedral, an important pilgrimage church south of Paris. The Romanesque cathedral was destroyed by fire in 1194, but was swiftly rebuilt in the new style, with contributions from King Philip II of France, Pope Celestine III, local gentry, merchants, craftsmen, and Richard the Lionheart, king of England. The builders simplified the elevation used at Notre Dame, eliminated the tribune galleries, and used flying buttresses to support the upper walls. The walls were filled with stained glass, mainly depicting the story of the Virgin Mary but also, in a small corner of each window, illustrating the crafts of the guilds who donated those windows.

The model of Chartres was followed by a series of new cathedrals of unprecedented height and size. These were Reims Cathedral (begun 1211), where coronations of the kings of France took place; Amiens Cathedral (1220–1226); Bourges Cathedral (1195–1230) (which, unlike the others, continued to use six-part rib vaults); and Beauvais Cathedral (1225–).

In central Europe, the High Gothic style appeared in the Holy Roman Empire, first at Toul (1220–), whose Romanesque cathedral was rebuilt in the style of Reims Cathedral; then Trier's Liebfrauenkirche parish church (1228–), and then throughout the Reich, beginning with the Elisabethkirche at Marburg (1235–) and the cathedral at Metz (c.1235–).

In High Gothic, the whole surface of the clerestory was given over to windows. At Chartres Cathedral, plate tracery was used for the rose window, but at Reims the bar-tracery was free-standing. Lancet windows were supplanted by multiple lights separated by geometrical bar-tracery. Tracery of this kind distinguishes Middle Pointed style from the simpler First Pointed. Inside, the nave was divided into by regular bays, each covered by a quadripartite rib vaults.

Other characteristics of the High Gothic were the development of rose windows of greater size, using bar-tracery, higher and longer flying buttresses, which could reach up to the highest windows, and walls of sculpture illustrating biblical stories filling the façade and the fronts of the transept. Reims Cathedral had two thousand three hundred statues on the front and back side of the façade.

The new High Gothic churches competed to be the tallest, with increasingly ambitious structures lifting the vault yet higher. Chartres Cathedral's height of 38 m (125 ft) was exceeded by Beauvais Cathedral's 48 m (157 ft), but on account of the latter's collapse in 1248, no further attempt was made to build higher. Attention turned from achieving greater height to creating more awe-inspiring decoration.

=== Rayonnant and Decorated ===
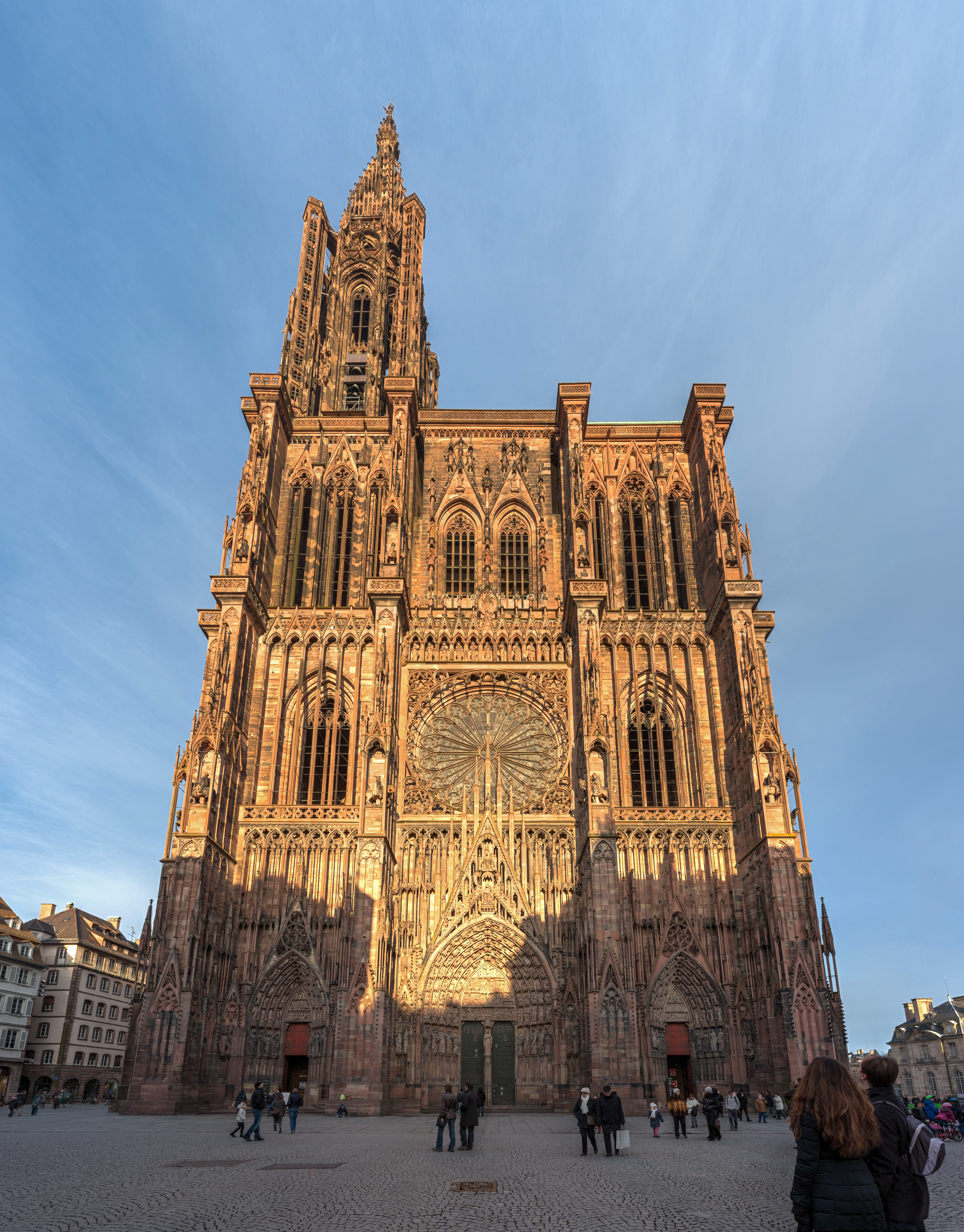
Rayonnant Gothic west front Strasbourg Cathedral (1276–)

Rayonnant Gothic maximized the coverage of stained glass windows such that the walls are effectively entirely glazed; examples are the nave of Saint-Denis (1231–) and the royal chapel of Louis IX of France on the Île de la Cité in the Seine – the Sainte-Chapelle (c.1241–1248). The high and thin walls of French Rayonnant Gothic allowed by the flying buttresses enabled increasingly ambitious expanses of glass and decorated tracery, reinforced with ironwork. Shortly after Saint-Denis, in the 1250s, Louis IX commissioned the rebuilt transepts and enormous rose windows of Notre-Dame de Paris (1250s for the north transept, 1258 for the beginning of south transept). This first 'international style' was also used in the clerestory of Metz Cathedral (c. 1245–), then in the choir of Cologne's cathedral (c. 1250–), and again in the nave of the cathedral at Strasbourg (c. 1250–). Masons elaborated a series of tracery patterns for windows – from the basic geometric to the reticulated and the curvilinear – which had superseded the lancet window. Bar-tracery of the curvilinear, flowing, and reticulated types distinguish Decorated style.

Decorated Gothic similarly sought to emphasize the windows, but excelled in the ornamentation of their tracery. Churches with features of this style include Westminster Abbey (1245–), the cathedrals at Lichfield (after 1257–) and Exeter (1275–), Bath Abbey (1298–), and the retro choir at Wells Cathedral (c.1320–).

The Rayonnant developed its second 'international style' with increasingly autonomous and sharp-edged tracery mouldings apparent in the cathedral at Clermont-Ferrand (1248–), the papal collegiate church at Troyes, Saint-Urbain (1262–), and the west façade of Strasbourg Cathedral (1276–1439)). By 1300, there were examples influenced by Strasbourg in the cathedrals of Limoges (1273–), Regensburg (c. 1275–), and in the cathedral nave at York (1292–).

=== Late Gothic: Flamboyant and Perpendicular ===
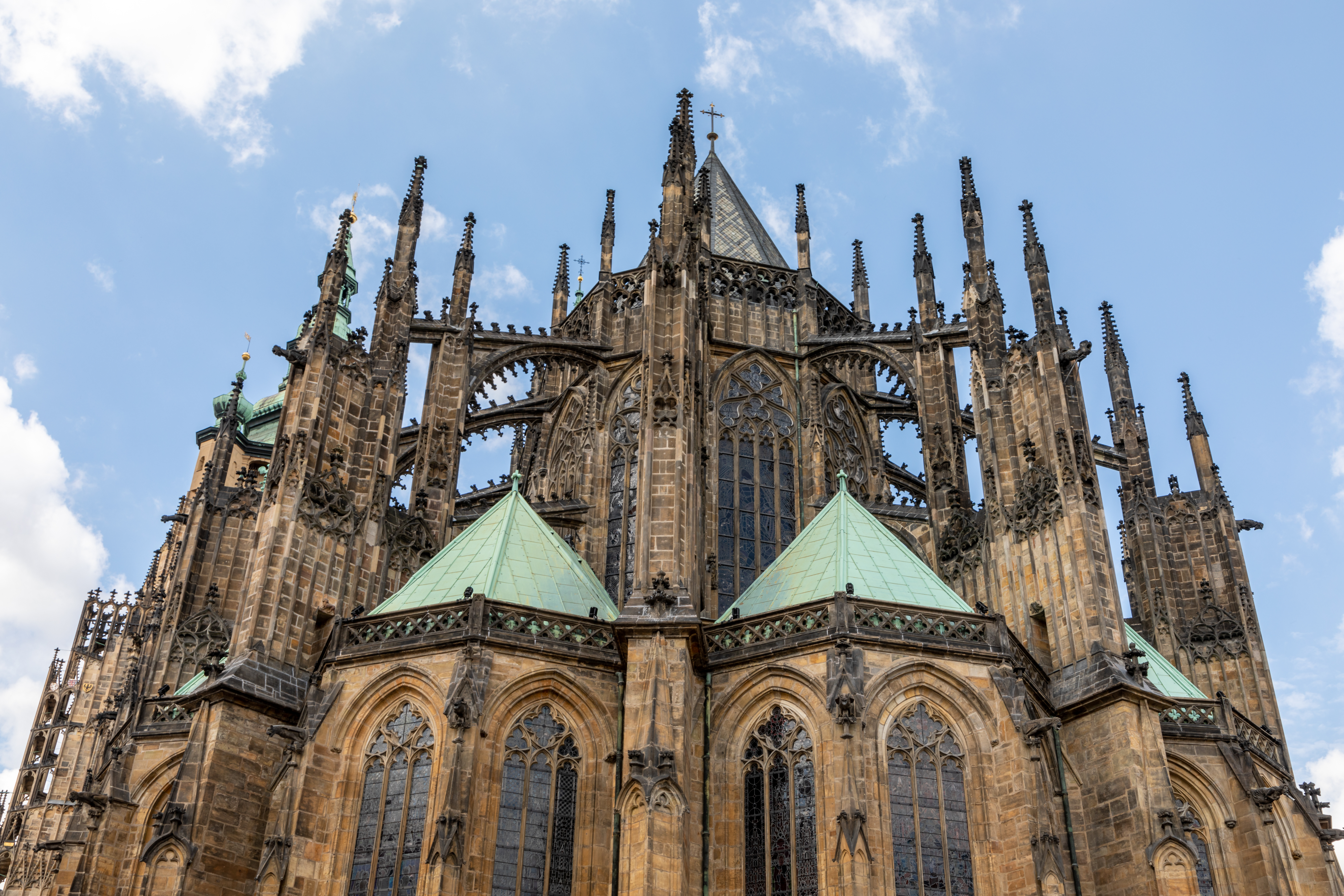
Flamboyant Gothic east end, Prague Cathedral (begun 1344)

Perpendicular east end, York Minster (1390s)

Central Europe began to lead the emergence of a new, international Flamboyant style with the construction of a new cathedral at Prague (1344–) under the direction of Peter Parler. This model of rich and variegated tracery and intricate reticulated rib-vaulting was definitive in the Late Gothic of continental Europe, emulated not only by the collegiate churches and cathedrals, but by urban parish churches which rivalled them in size and magnificence. The minster at Ulm and other parish churches like the Heilig-Kreuz-Münster at Schwäbisch Gmünd (c.1320–), St Barbara's Church at Kutná Hora (1389–), and the Heilig-Geist-Kirche (1407–) and St Martin's Church (c.1385–) in Landshut are typical. Use of ogees was especially common.

The flamboyant style was characterised by the multiplication of the ribs of the vaults, with new purely decorative ribs, called tiercons and liernes, and additional diagonal ribs. One common ornament of flamboyant in France is the arc-en-accolade, an arch over a window topped by a pinnacle, which was itself topped with fleuron, and flanked by other pinnacles. Examples of French flamboyant building include the west façade of Rouen Cathedral, and especially the façades of Sainte-Chapelle de Vincennes (1370s) and choir Mont-Saint-Michel's abbey church (1448). Lacy patterns of tracery continued to characterize continental Gothic building, with very elaborate and articulated vaulting, as at Saint Barbara's, Kutná Hora (1512).

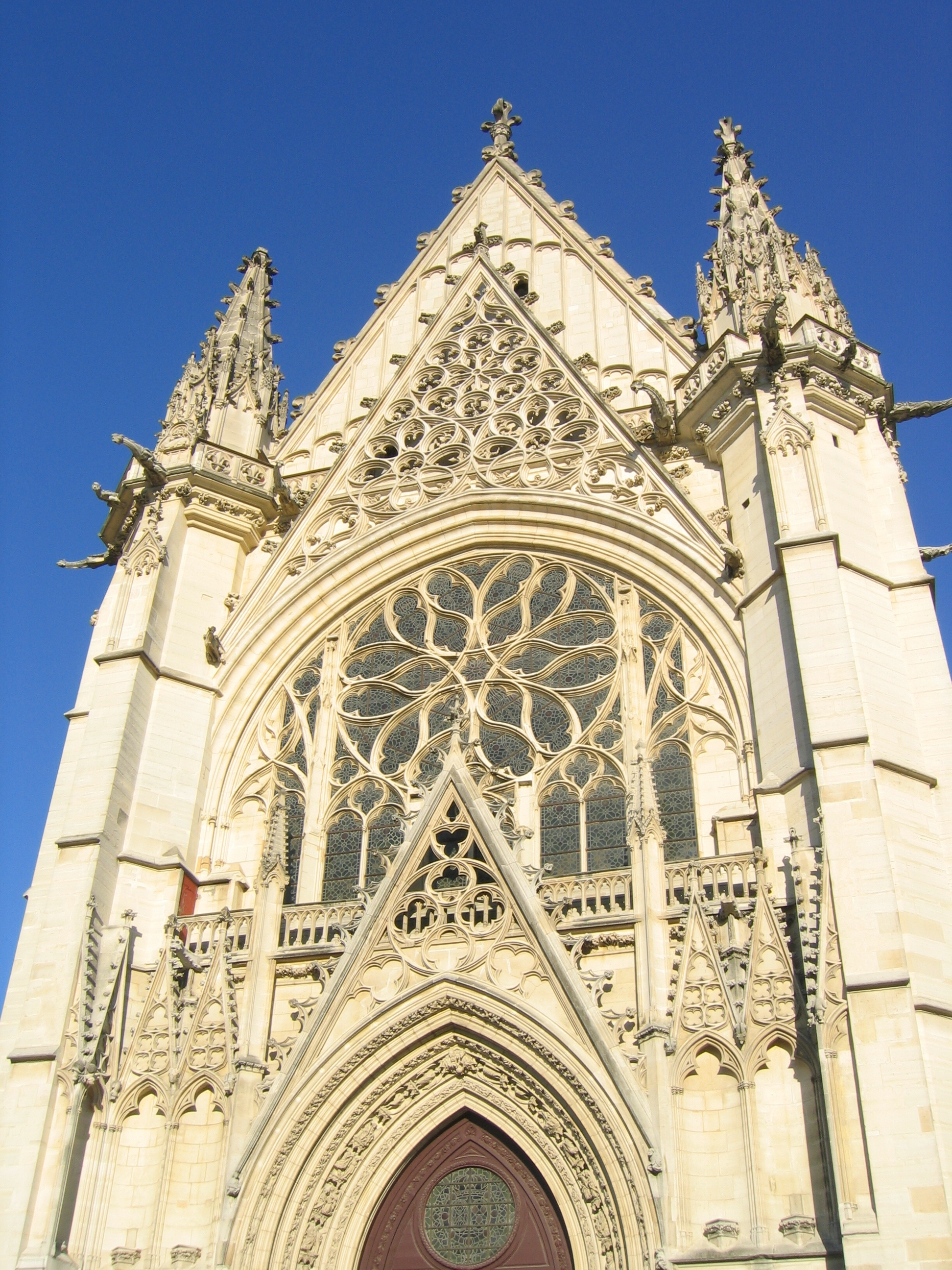
Sainte-Chapelle de Vincennes (1370s)

In England, ornamental rib-vaulting and tracery of Decorated Gothic co-existed with, and then gave way to, the Perpendicular style from the 1320s, with straightened, orthogonal tracery topped with fan-vaulting. Perpendicular Gothic was unknown in continental Europe and unlike earlier styles had no equivalent in Scotland or Ireland. It first appeared in the cloisters and chapter-house (c. 1332) of Old St Paul's Cathedral in London by William de Ramsey. The chancel of Gloucester Cathedral (c. 1337–1357) and its latter 14th century cloisters are early examples. Four-centred arches were often used, and lierne vaults seen in early buildings were developed into fan vaults, first at the latter 14th century chapter-house of Hereford Cathedral (demolished 1769) and cloisters at Gloucester, and then at Reginald Ely's King's College Chapel, Cambridge (1446–1461) and the brothers William and Robert Vertue's Henry VII Chapel (c. 1503–1512) at Westminster Abbey. Perpendicular is sometimes called Third Pointed and was employed over three centuries; the fan-vaulted staircase at Christ Church, Oxford was built around 1640.

=== Decline and transition ===
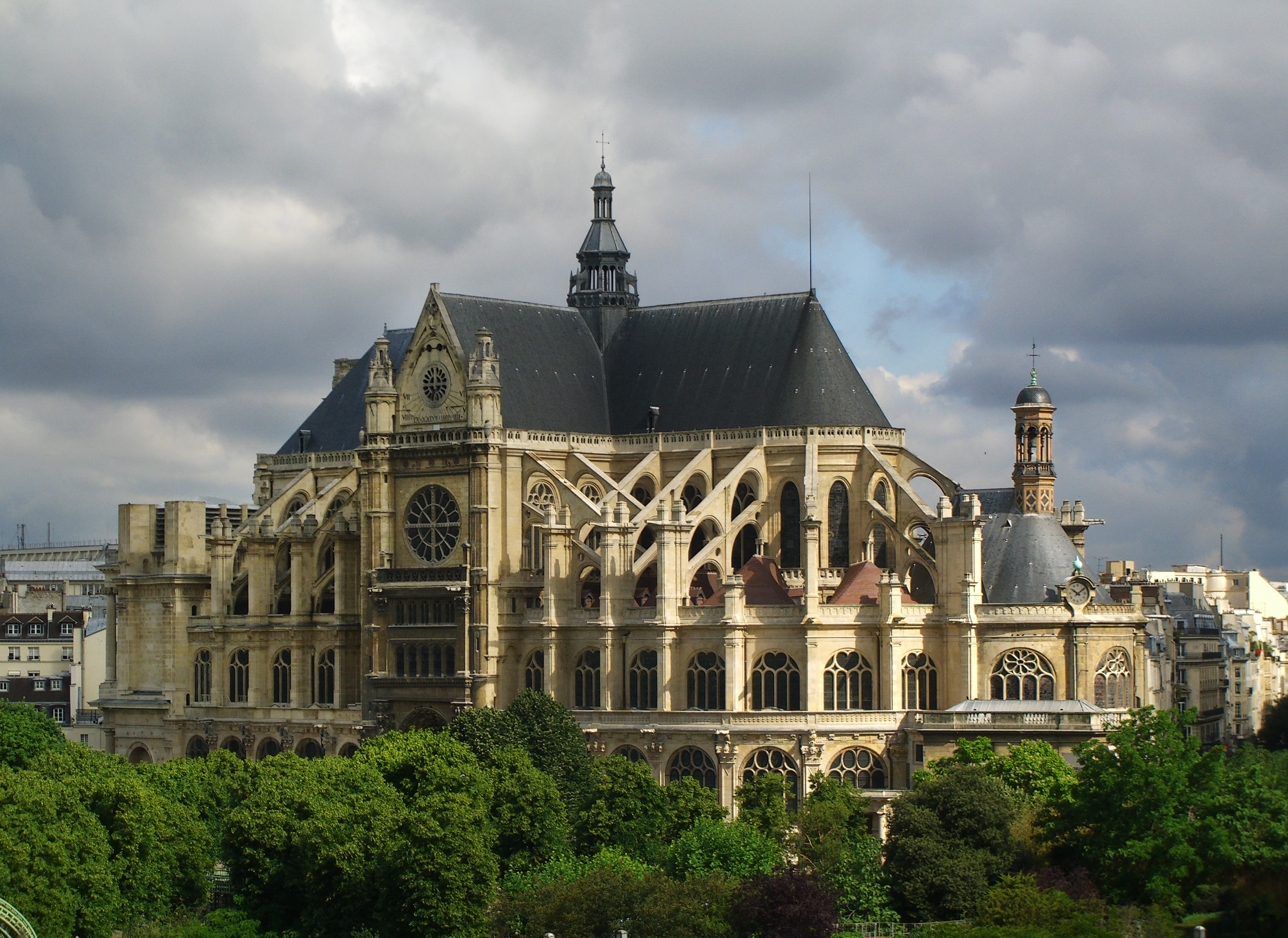
Paris, Saint-Eustache (1532–1633)

Beginning in the mid-15th century, the Gothic style gradually lost its dominance in Europe. It had never been popular in Italy, and in the mid-15th century the Italians, drawing upon ancient Roman ruins, returned to classical models. The dome of Florence Cathedral (1420–1436) by Filippo Brunelleschi, inspired by the Pantheon, Rome, was one of the first Renaissance landmarks, but it also employed Gothic technology; the outer skin of the dome was supported by a framework of twenty-four ribs. In the 16th century, as Renaissance architecture from Italy began to appear in France and other countries in Europe. The Gothic style began to be described as outdated, ugly and even barbaric. The term "Gothic" was first used as a pejorative description. Giorgio Vasari used the term "barbarous German style" in his 1550 Lives of the Artists to describe what is now considered the Gothic style. In the introduction to the Lives he attributed various architectural features to the Goths whom he held responsible for destroying the ancient buildings after they conquered Rome, and erecting new ones in this style. In the 17th century, Molière also mocked the Gothic style in the 1669 poem La Gloire: "...the insipid taste of Gothic ornamentation, these odious monstrosities of an ignorant age, produced by the torrents of barbarism..." The dominant styles in Europe became in turn Italian Renaissance architecture, Baroque architecture, and the grand classicism of the style Louis XIV.

The Kings of France had first-hand knowledge of the new Italian style, because of the military campaign of Charles VIII to Naples and Milan (1494), and especially the campaigns of Louis XII and François I (1500–1505) to restore French control over Milan and Genoa. They brought back Italian paintings, sculpture and building plans, and, more importantly, Italian craftsmen and artists. The Cardinal Georges d'Amboise, chief minister of Louis XII, built the Chateau of Gaillon near Rouen (1502–1510) with the assistance of Italian craftsmen. The Château de Blois (1515–1524) introduced the Renaissance loggia and open stairway. François I installed Leonardo da Vinci at his Chateau of Chambord in 1516, and introduced a Renaissance long gallery at the Palace of Fontainebleau in 1528–1540. In 1546 François I began building the first example of French classicism, the square courtyard of the Louvre Palace designed by Pierre Lescot.

Nonetheless, new Gothic buildings, particularly churches, continued to be built. New Gothic churches built in Paris in this period included Saint-Merri (1520–1552) and Saint-Germain l'Auxerrois. The first signs of classicism in Paris churches did not appear until 1540, at Saint-Gervais-Saint-Protais. The largest new church, Saint-Eustache (1532–1560), rivalled Notre-Dame in size, 105 m (344 ft) long, 44 m (144 ft) wide, and 35 m (115 ft) high. As construction of this church continued, elements of Renaissance decoration, including the system of classical orders of columns, were added to the design, making it a Gothic-Renaissance hybrid.

In Germany, some Italian elements were introduced at the Fugger Chapel of St. Anne's Church, Augsburg (1510–1512), combined with Gothic vaults; and others appeared in the Church of St. Michael in Munich, but in Germany Renaissance elements were used primarily for decoration. Some Renaissance elements also appeared in Spain, in the new palace begun by Emperor Charles V in Granada, within the Alhambra (1485–1550), inspired by Bramante and Raphael, but it was never completed. The first major Renaissance work in Spain was El Escorial, the monastery-palace built by Philip II of Spain.

Under Henry VIII and Elizabeth I, England was largely isolated from architectural developments on the continent. The first classical building in England was the Old Somerset House in London (1547–1552) (since demolished), built by Edward Seymour, 1st Duke of Somerset, who was regent as Lord Protector for Edward VI until the young king came of age in 1547. Somerset's successor, John Dudley, 1st Duke of Northumberland, sent the architectural scholar John Shute to Italy to study the style. Shute published the first book in English on classical architecture in 1570. The first English houses in the new style were Burghley House (1550s–1580s) and Longleat, built by associates of Somerset. With those buildings, a new age of architecture began in England.

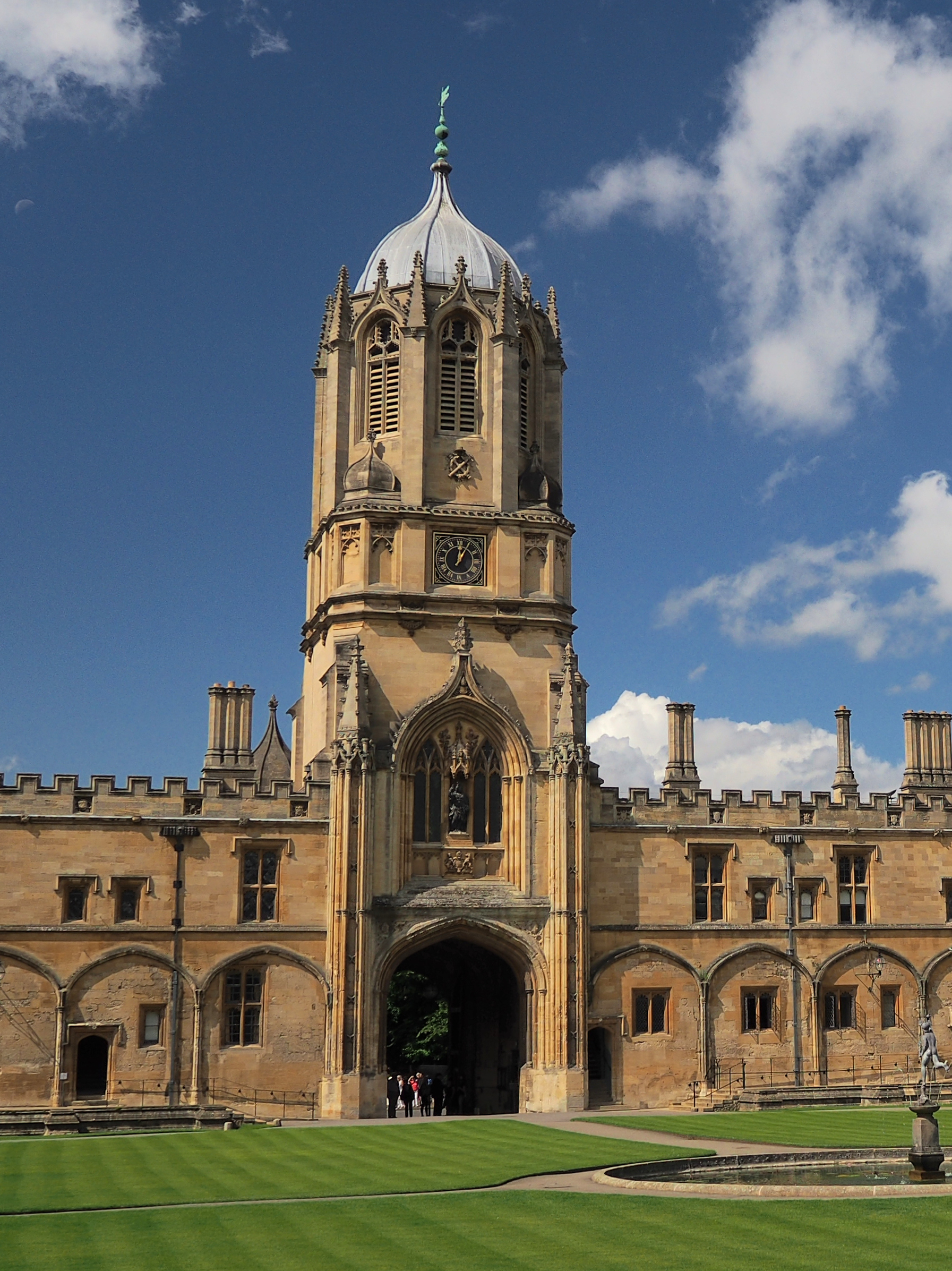
Tom Tower, Christ Church, Oxford

Gothic architecture, usually churches or university buildings, continued to be built. Ireland was an island of Gothic architecture in the 17th and 18th centuries, with the construction of Derry Cathedral (completed 1633), Sligo Cathedral (c. 1730), and Down Cathedral (1790–1818) are other examples. In the 17th and 18th century several important Gothic buildings were constructed at Oxford University and Cambridge University, including Tom Tower (1681–82) at Christ Church, Oxford, by Christopher Wren.

Despite adopting the style when required by his clients, Wren strongly disliked the Gothic. When he was appointed Surveyor of the Fabric at Westminster Abbey in the year 1698, he expressed his distaste for the Gothic style in a letter to the Bishop of Rochester:

Nothing was thought magnificent that was not high beyond Measure, with the Flutter of Arch-buttresses, so we call the sloping Arches that poise the higher Vaultings of the Nave. The Romans always concealed their Butments, whereas the Normans thought them ornamental. These I have observed are the first Things that occasion the Ruin of Cathedrals, being so much exposed to the Air and Weather; the Coping, which cannot defend them, first failing, and if they give Way, the Vault must spread. Pinnacles are no Use, and as little Ornament.

— Christopher Wren, Parentalia

Nonetheless, Wren praised "Srarcenic" architecture for its "superior" vaulting techniques and widespread use of the pointed arch, which he knew to be more structurally efficient than the "Roman" rounded arch.

"Gothick", as it was often styled, also appeared, in a whimsical fashion, in Horace Walpole's Twickenham villa, Strawberry Hill (1749–1776). The two western towers of Westminster Abbey were constructed after 1722 by Nicholas Hawksmoor, opening a new period of Gothic Revival. Gothic architecture survived the early modern period and flourished again in a revival from the late 18th century and throughout the 19th. Perpendicular was the first Gothic style revived in the 18th century.

=== Rediscovery and revival ===
Liverpool Cathedral (1904-78)

In England, partly in response to a philosophy propounded by the Oxford Movement and others associated with the emerging revival of 'high church' or Anglo-Catholic ideas during the second quarter of the 19th century, neo-Gothic began to become promoted by influential establishment figures as the preferred style for ecclesiastical, civic and institutional architecture. The appeal of this Gothic Revival (which after 1837, in Britain, is sometimes termed Victorian Gothic), gradually widened to encompass "low church" as well as "high church" clients. This period of more universal appeal, spanning 1855–1885, is known in Britain as High Victorian Gothic.

The Palace of Westminster in London by Sir Charles Barry with interiors by a major exponent of the early Gothic Revival, Augustus Welby Pugin, is an example of the Gothic revival style from its earlier period in the second quarter of the 19th century. Examples from the High Victorian Gothic period include George Gilbert Scott's design for the Albert Memorial in London, and William Butterfield's chapel at Keble College, Oxford. From the second half of the 19th century onwards, it became more common in Britain for neo-Gothic to be used in the design of non-ecclesiastical and non-governmental buildings types. Gothic details even began to appear in working-class housing schemes subsidised by philanthropy, though given the expense, less frequently than in the design of upper and middle-class housing.

The middle of the 19th century was a period marked by the restoration, and in some cases modification, of ancient monuments and the construction of neo-Gothic edifices such as the nave of Cologne Cathedral and the Sainte-Clotilde of Paris as speculation of mediaeval architecture turned to technical consideration. London's Palace of Westminster, St Pancras railway station, New York's Trinity Church and St Patrick's Cathedral are also famous examples of Gothic Revival buildings. The style also reached the Far East in the period, for instance at St John's Cathedral in Hong Kong.

== Regional variations of French Gothic ==
=== Angevin Gothic ===
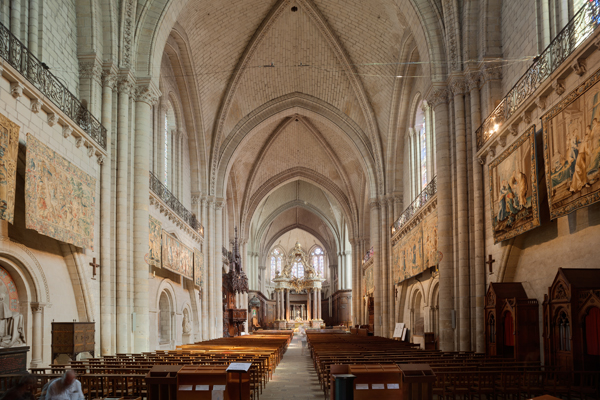
Angers Cathedral (1250).

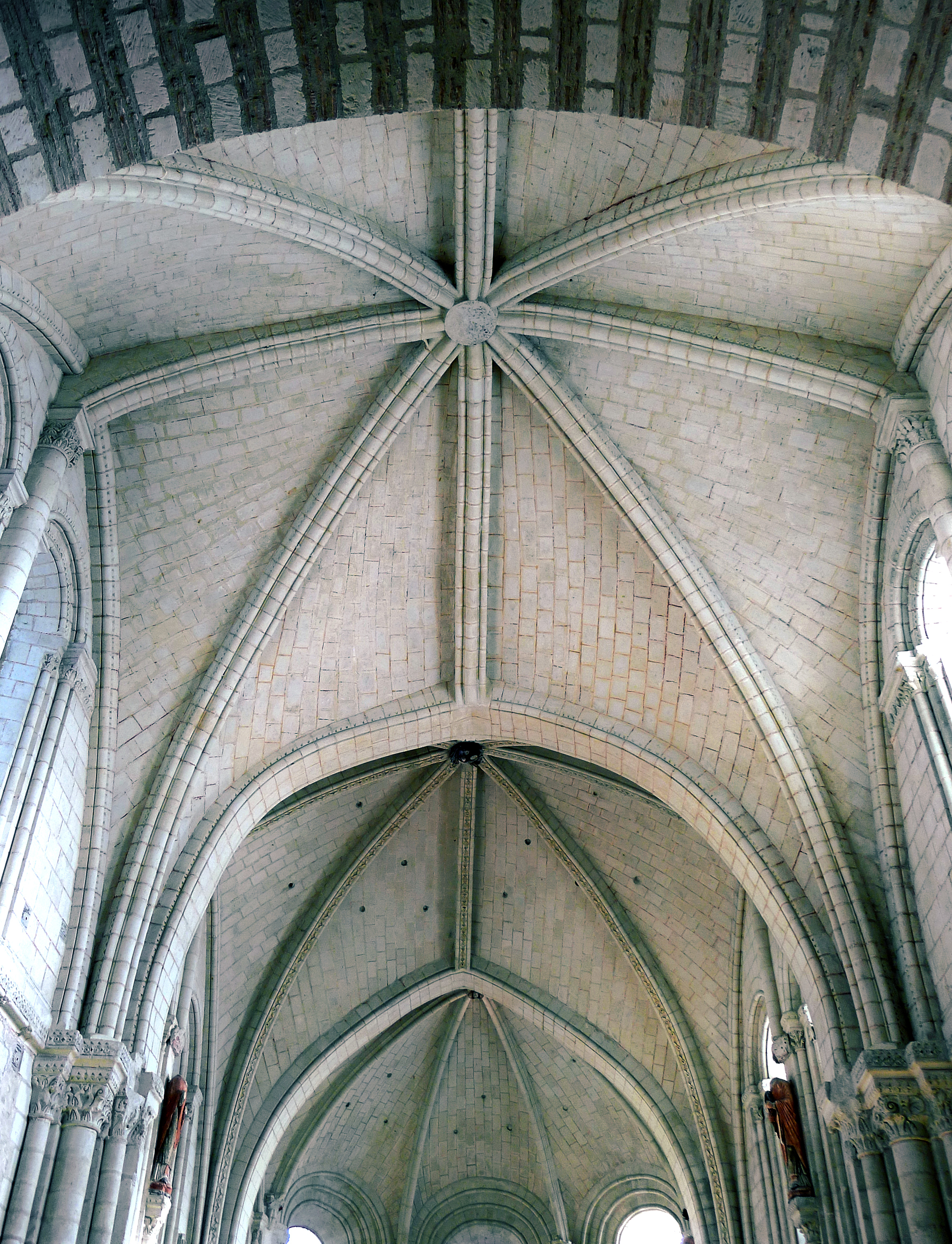
Vaults of the Church of Saint-Martin, Angers (late 12th century).

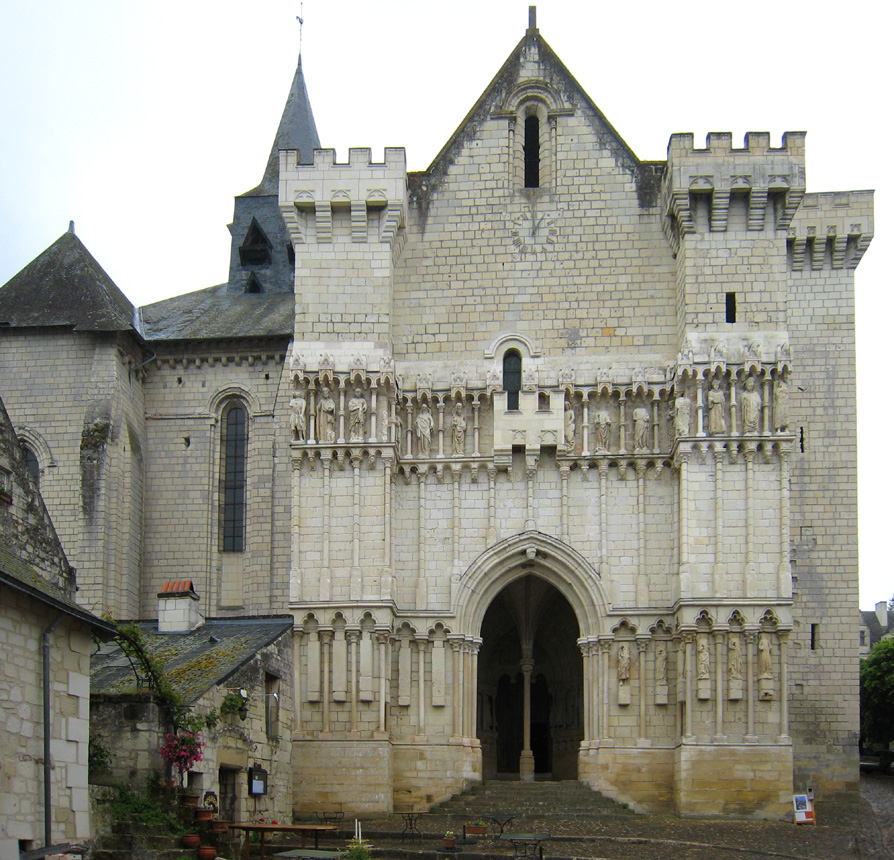
Façade of the Collegiate Church of Saint-Martin of Candes (1175–1250).

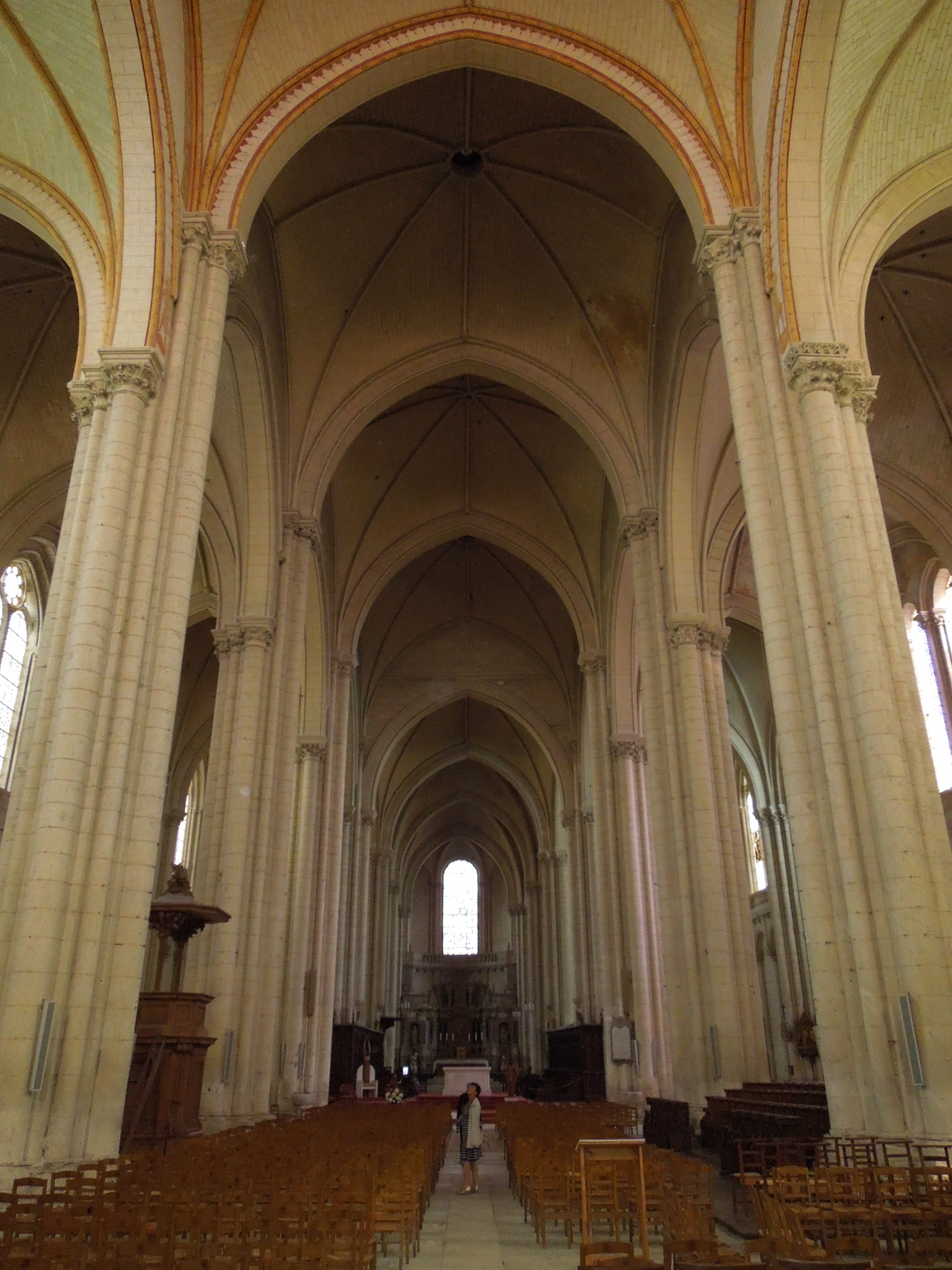
Poitiers Cathedral

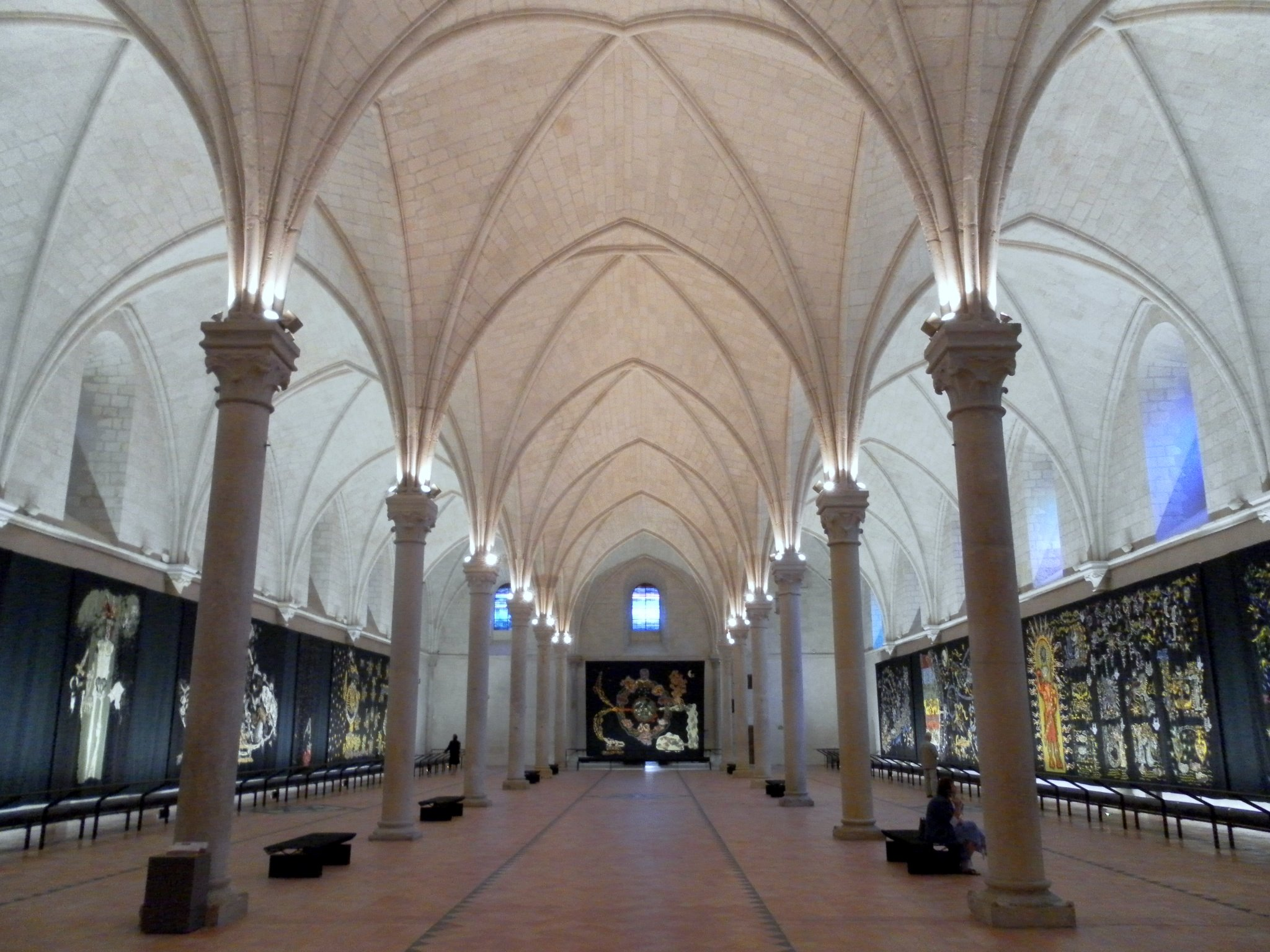
Domical vaults in St John's Hospital, Angers (1188)

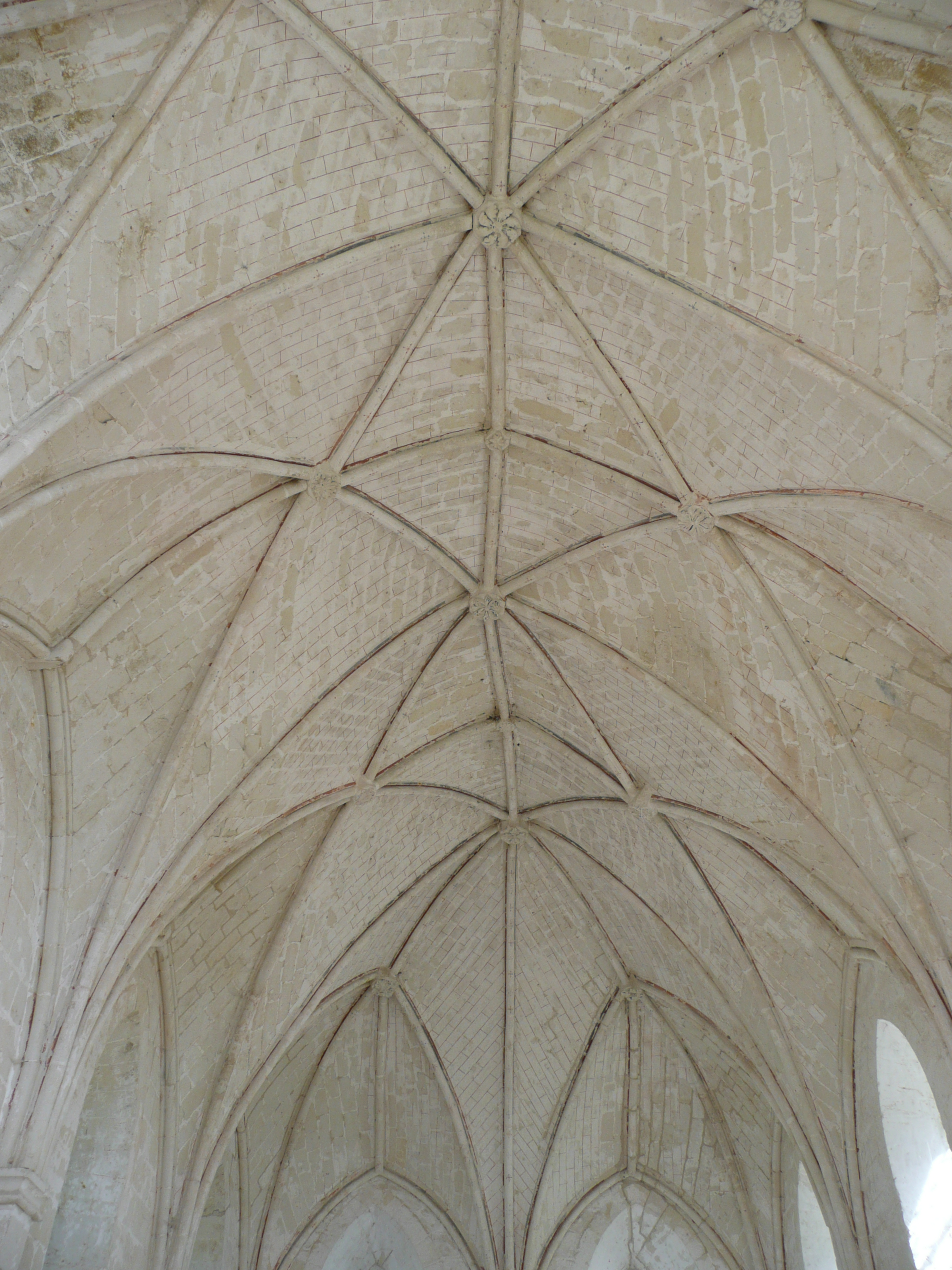
Vaults of Boissière Abbey at Dénezé-sous-le-Lude (1212).

The emergence of Plantagenet or Angevin Gothic occurred in what is now western France at the same time as that of Île-de-France. It was linked to the political context of the Anglo-French Plantagenet dynasty. Unlike Île-de-France Gothic, this architectural style is characterized by facades with a single portal. In most cases, the hall church pattern is followed, with aisles as high as the nave. Some major churches, like Angers Cathedral, even lack aisles entirely. On the walls, the vaulting shafts were reduced to thin engaged columns with little projection. Sometimes, as in the nave of Le Mans Cathedral or in the Church of Notre-Dame de la Couture of Le Mans, statues marked the springing of the vault ribs, subverting the structural logic of vaulting shafts.

It is above all the vaults that distinguish Angevin Gothic. Emerging in the mid-12th century, its vaulting system developed the domed forms used in the local Romanesque architecture (for example at Périgueux Cathedral). Angevin Gothic vaults had a similarly domical profile, with the central keystone rising high above the vault's perimeter to produce an undulating ridge, very different to vaults elsewhere in France. This emphatic division of bays was reinforced by the use of heavy rib profiles, as seen at Angers Cathedral. The more vertical vault thrusts meant that flying buttresses were unnecessary, with Poitiers Cathedral having a sheer east wall instead of a chevet. Addding ridge ribs to this form of vaulting created an octopartite vault. From the 13th century onwards, lighter and more numerous and ribs appear, including liernes, as in the Abbey of St Sergius, Angers. After the incorporation of the region into the kingdom of France, more standard French Gothic forms began to be introduced, such as the triple portals in the façade of Poitiers Cathedral.

=== Norman Gothic ===
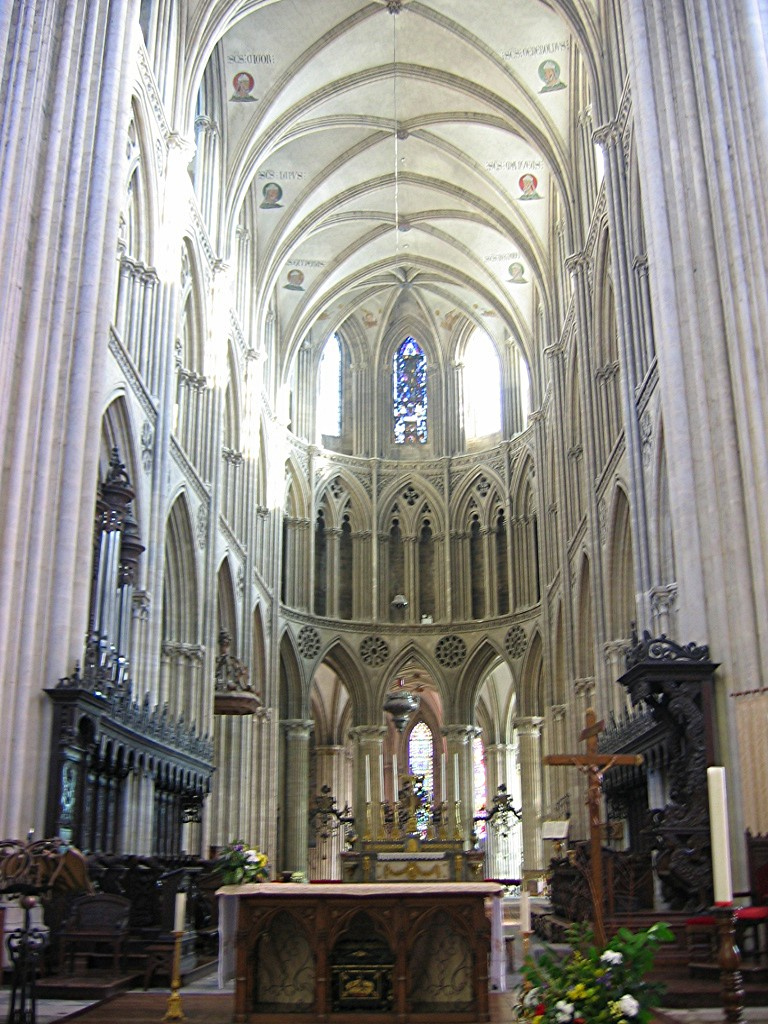
Bayeux Cathedral (c. 1230).

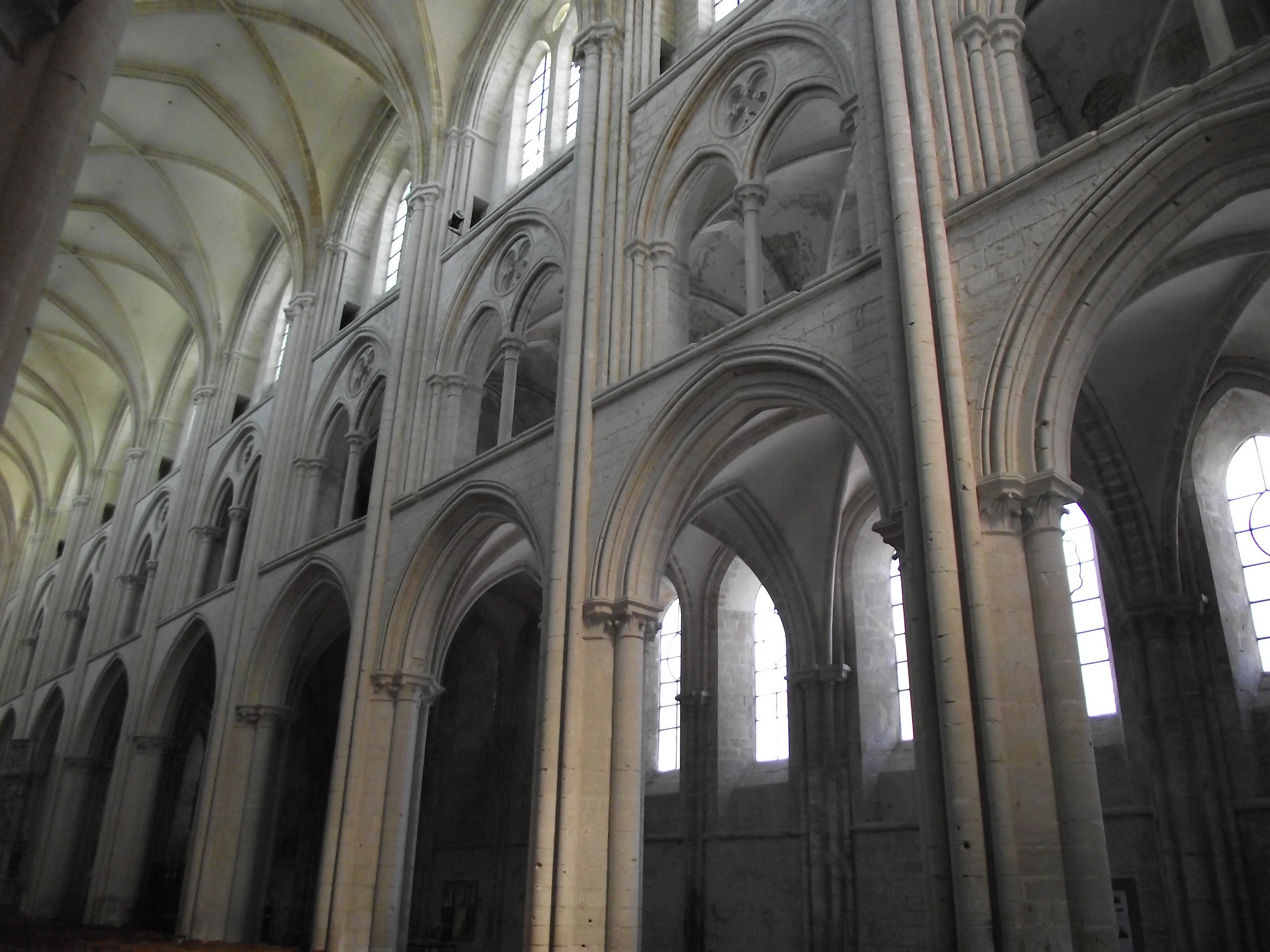
Nave of Fécamp Abbey (1187–1228).

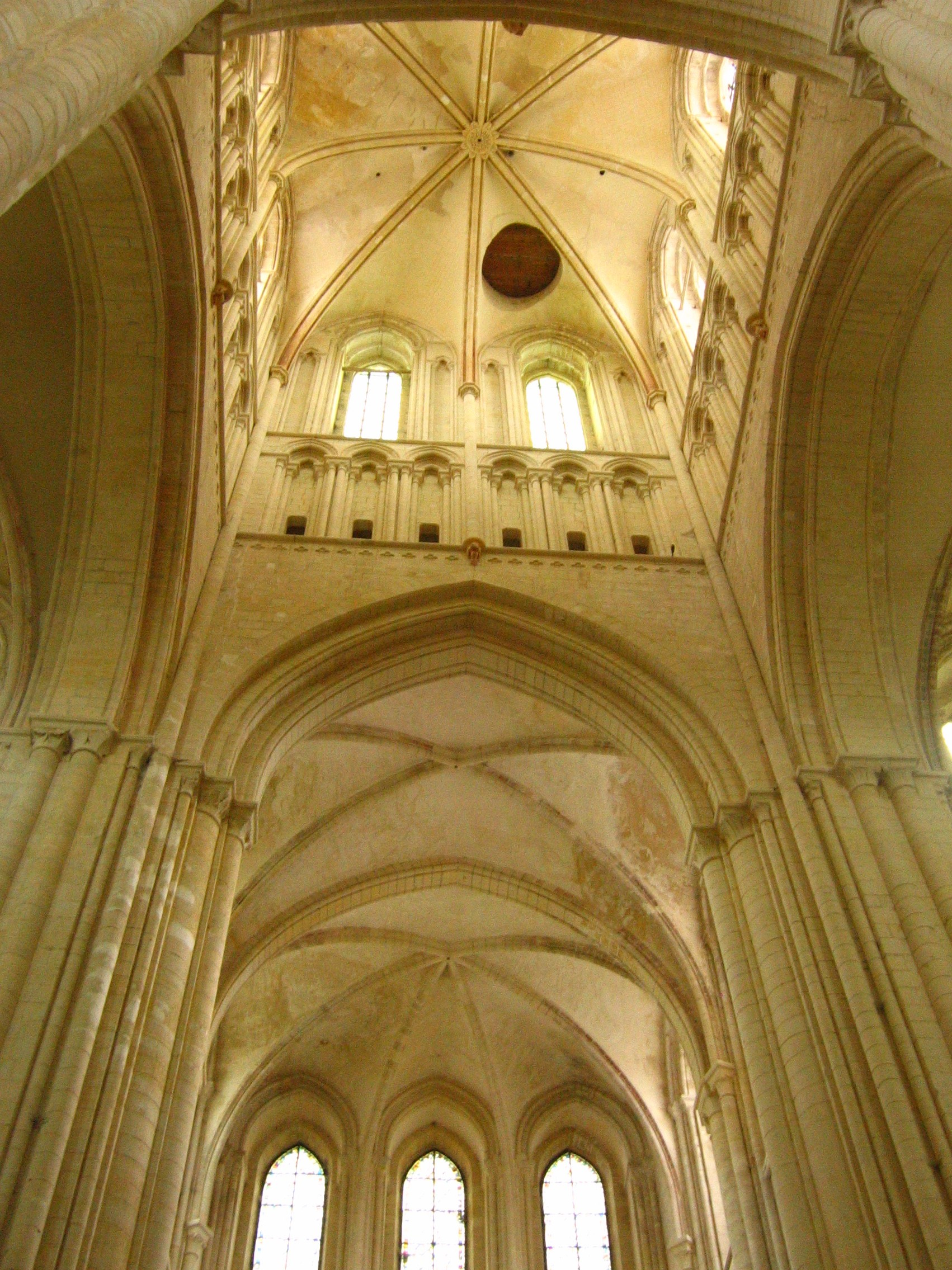
Lantern tower of Fécamp

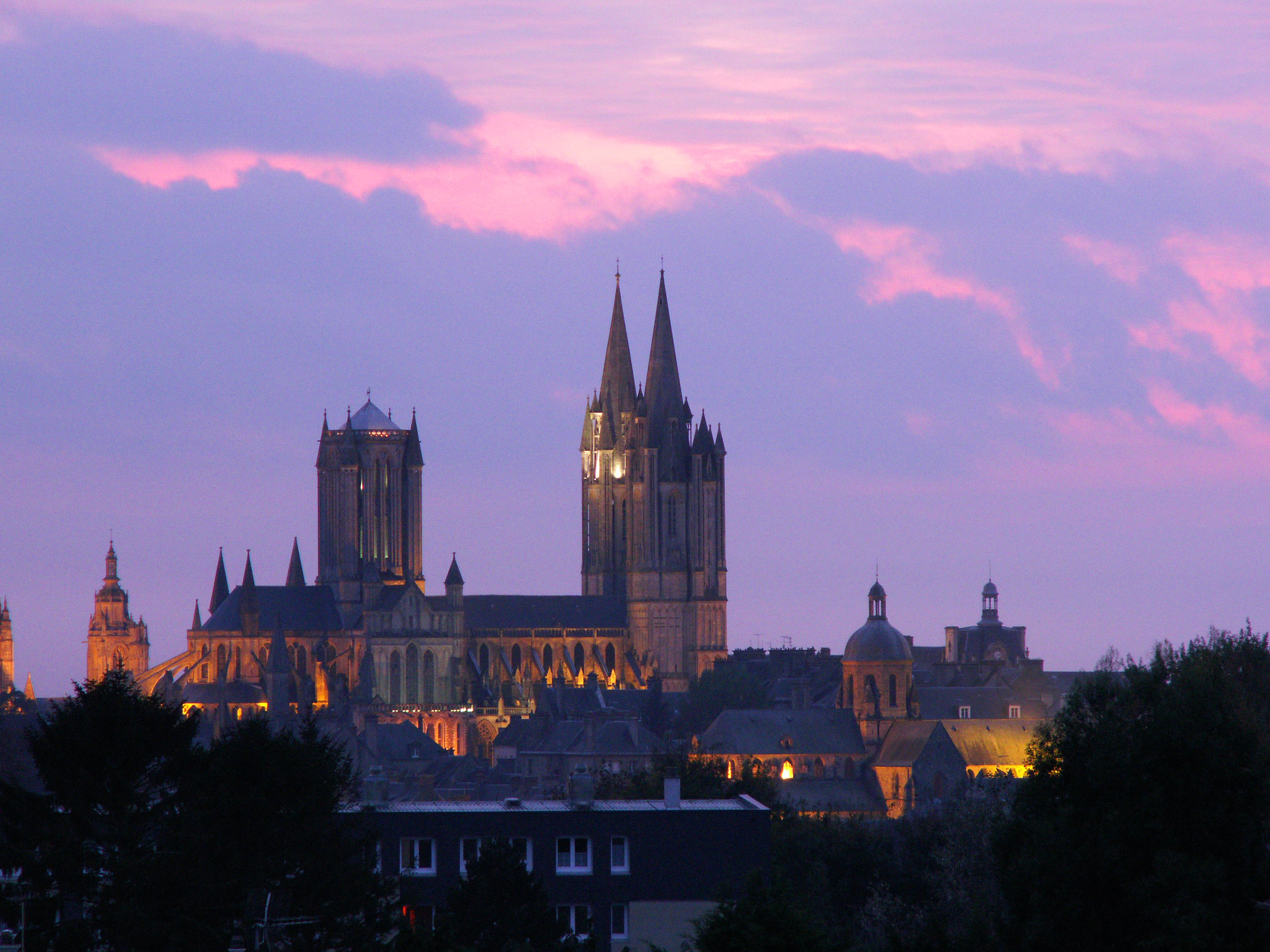
Coutances Cathedral (1180–1270).

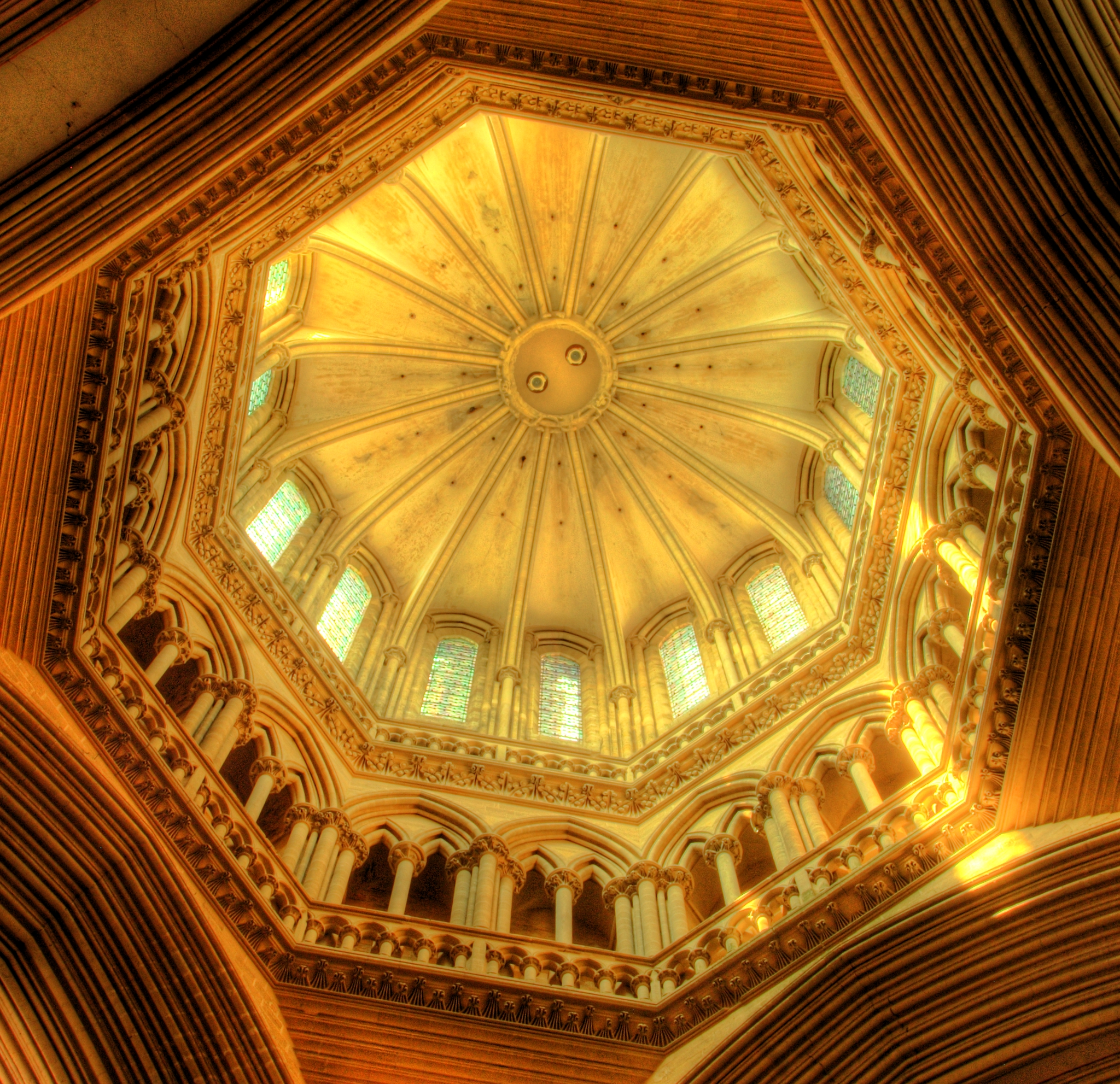
Lantern tower of Coutances

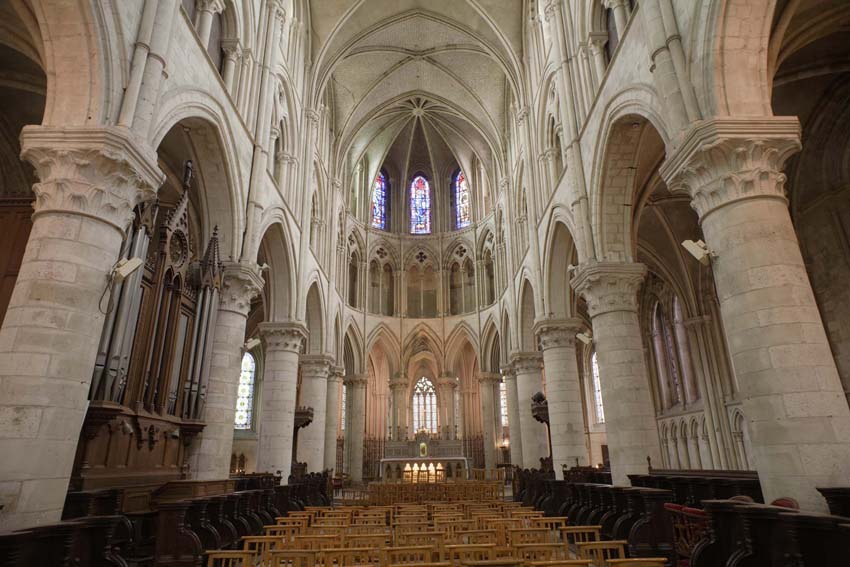
Lisieux Cathedral (c. 1223).

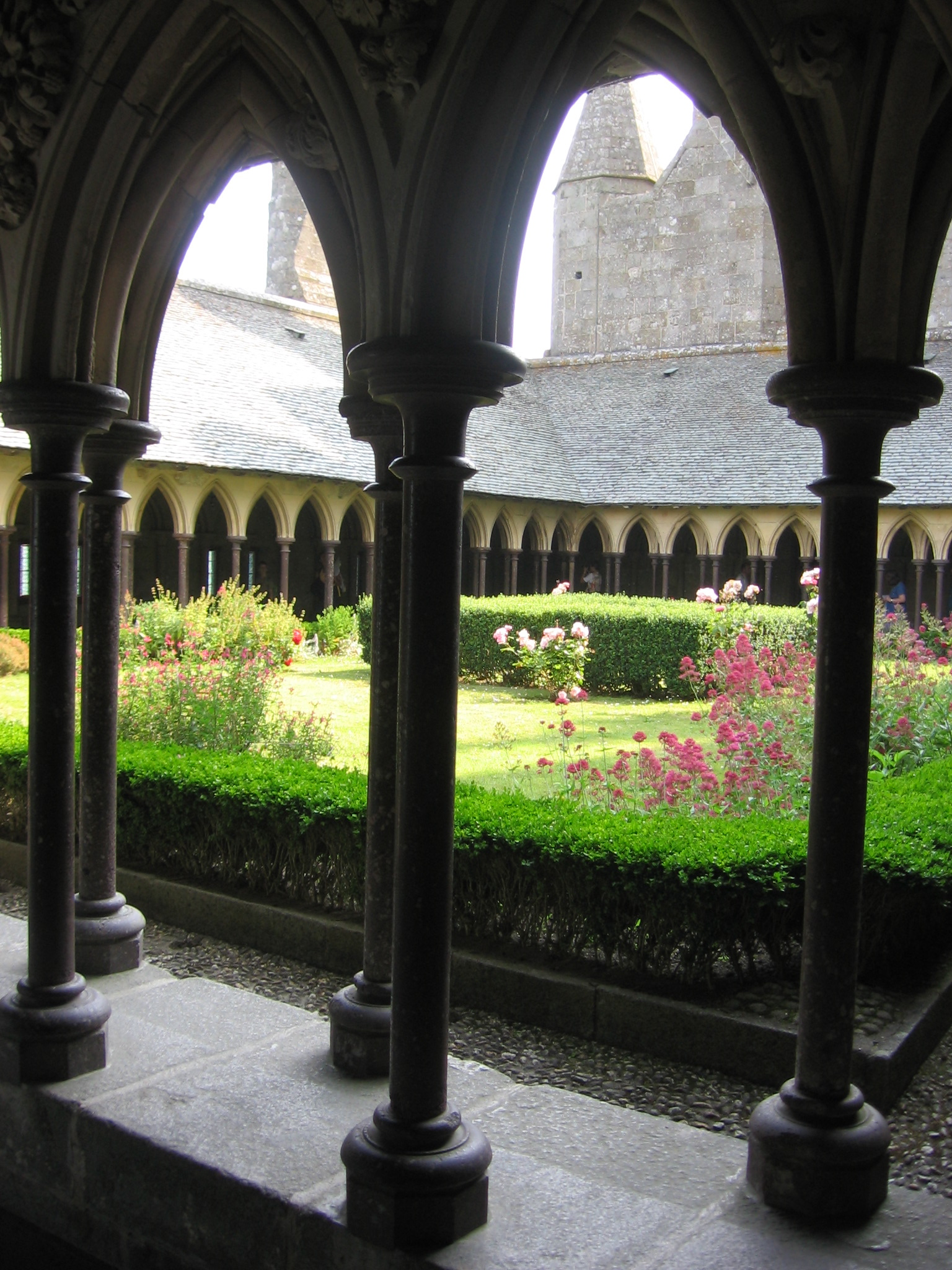
The cloister of the "Merveille" of Mont Saint-Michel (1225–1228).

The Duchy of Normandy, which was ruled by the kings of England, quickly adopted the Gothic style. The first example in the region was the nave of Lisieux Cathedral (1167 or 1170–1174); its bishop, Arnulf of Lisieux, was close to Abbot Suger and attended the consecration of Saint-Denis in 1144. Early Gothic churches in Normandy were wide, with long transepts and heavy vaults requiring thick walls.

Following his victories over John of England, Philip Augustus annexed the territory to the French royal domain in 1204: the influence of Île-de-France Gothic art then rapidly appeared in military architecture. From Paris, the round tower of the medieval Louvre Castle inspired not only the keeps of Rouen and Lillebonne, but also the Talbot keeps of Falaise and Gisors.

The plan of Norman Gothic churches was distinguished by an enlarged chapel on the central axis of the chevet, which served as the lady chapel, as at Fécamp Abbey. The arches were characteristically very sharply pointed (also known as lancet arches) and deeply moulded, while the quadripartite vault was favoured over the sexpartite. Another distinctive feature of Norman Gothic, in common with English Gothic, was the use of a high lantern tower instead of a small flèche above the crossing. Such towers feature at almost all the region's cathedrals, including Lisieux, Coutances, Rouen and Évreux. Where they are absent, this may be due to the original plans being curtailed, as at Sées Cathedral.

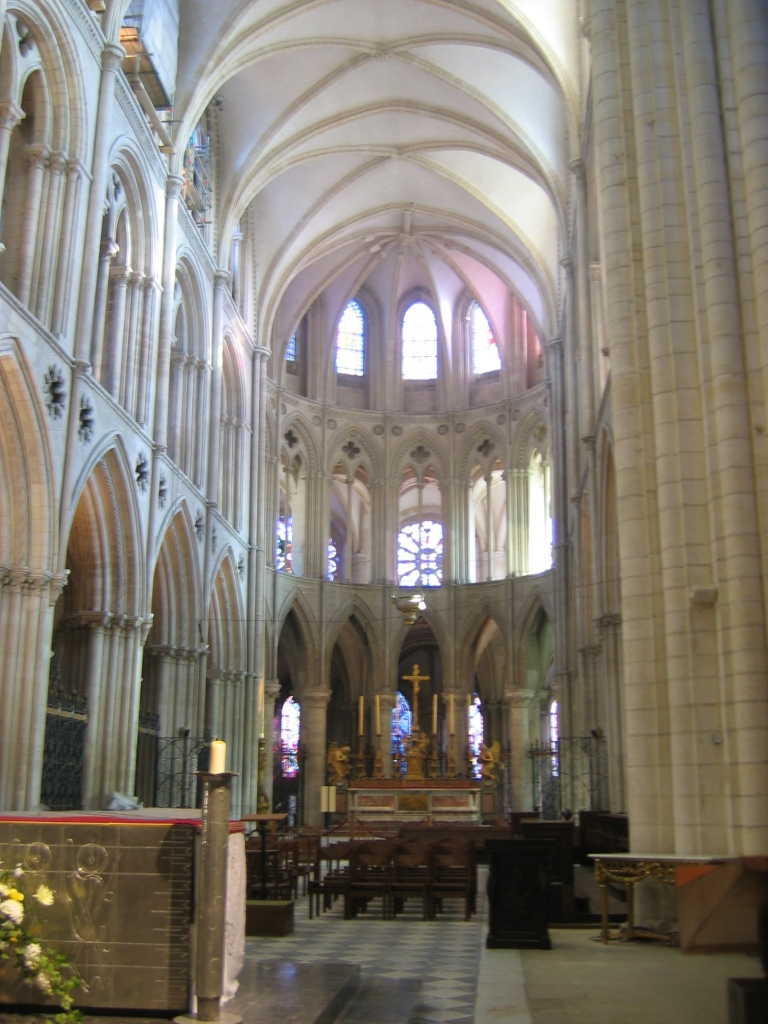
Abbey of Saint-Étienne, Caen

Rouen Cathedral (begun 1185) was rebuilt from Romanesque to Gothic with distinct Norman features, including a lantern tower, deeply moulded decoration, and high pointed arcades. The choir of the abbey church of Saint-Étienne of Caen was the first major building constructed after the end of the duchy (1204). The choir follows the Romanesque proportions of the nave, with a high tribune and a clerestory passage. The reconstruction of the choir of Bayeux Cathedral (c. 1230) likewise respects this Norman tradition of sharply pointed arches, tympana pierced with trefoils and an absence of statues. The Merveille at Mont Saint-Michel, with circular abaci, voussoirs in Caen stone and foliage carvings, was completed in 1228. At Coutances, reconstruction began with the nave (c.1220–1235). The building features a tall octagonal lantern tower, capitals with hollow circular abaci, lancet arches and pronounced moulding, contrasting with contemporary Île-de-France. The regional style is also expressed in the cathedral's facade, which displays soaring vertical lines.

The eastern end of the 13th century choir of Lisieux Cathedral reveals the increasing influence of standard French forms. The main columns are doubled, the abaci take a circular or polygonal form, and trefoils pierce the walls. Above all, the Gothic style appears much more developed and slender: a triforium replaces the false galleries of the nave, the arcades become narrower, the columns thinner, and the mouldings more refined.

=== Southern Gothic ===
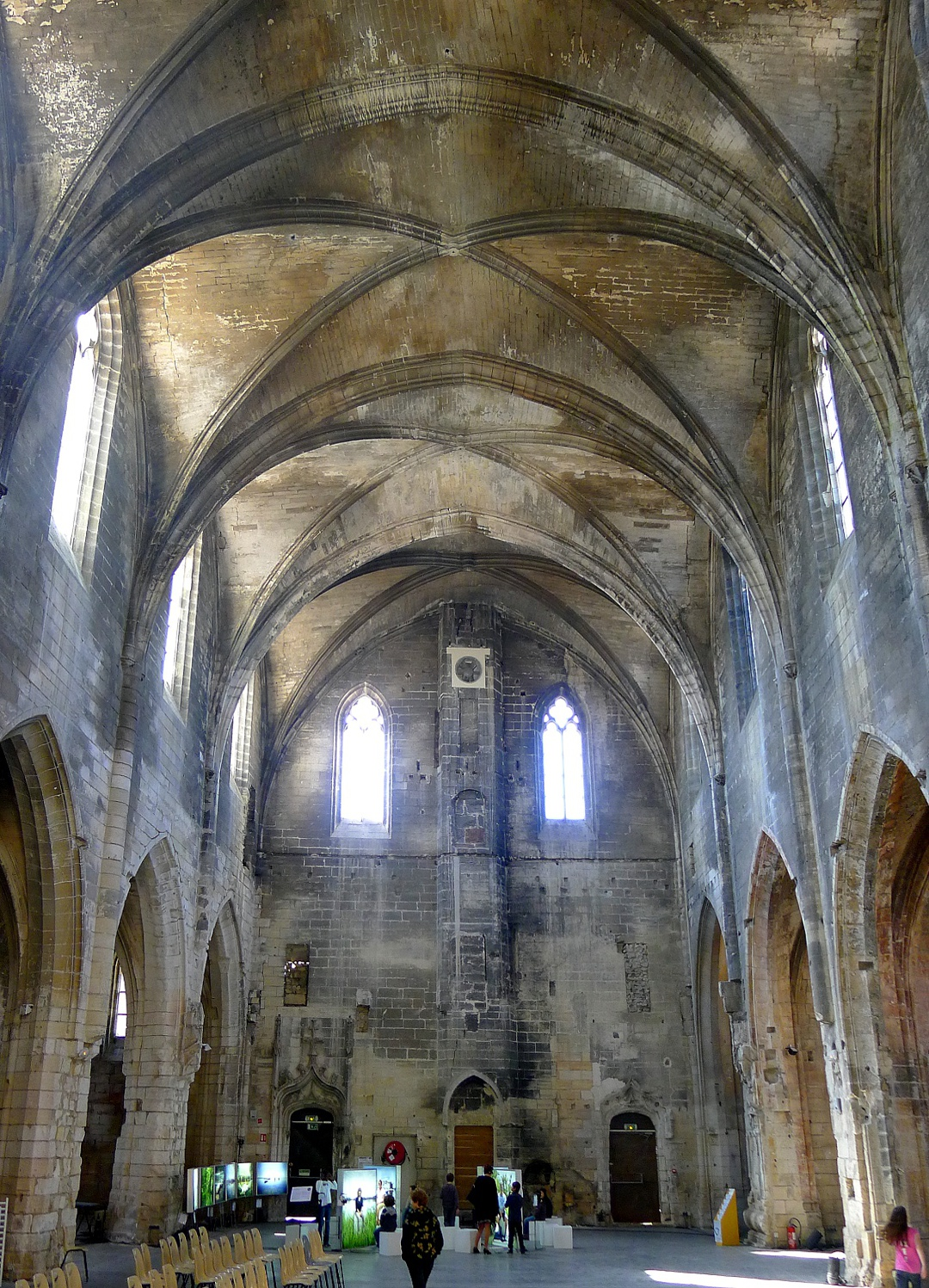
Dominican Church of Arles (1448–1499).

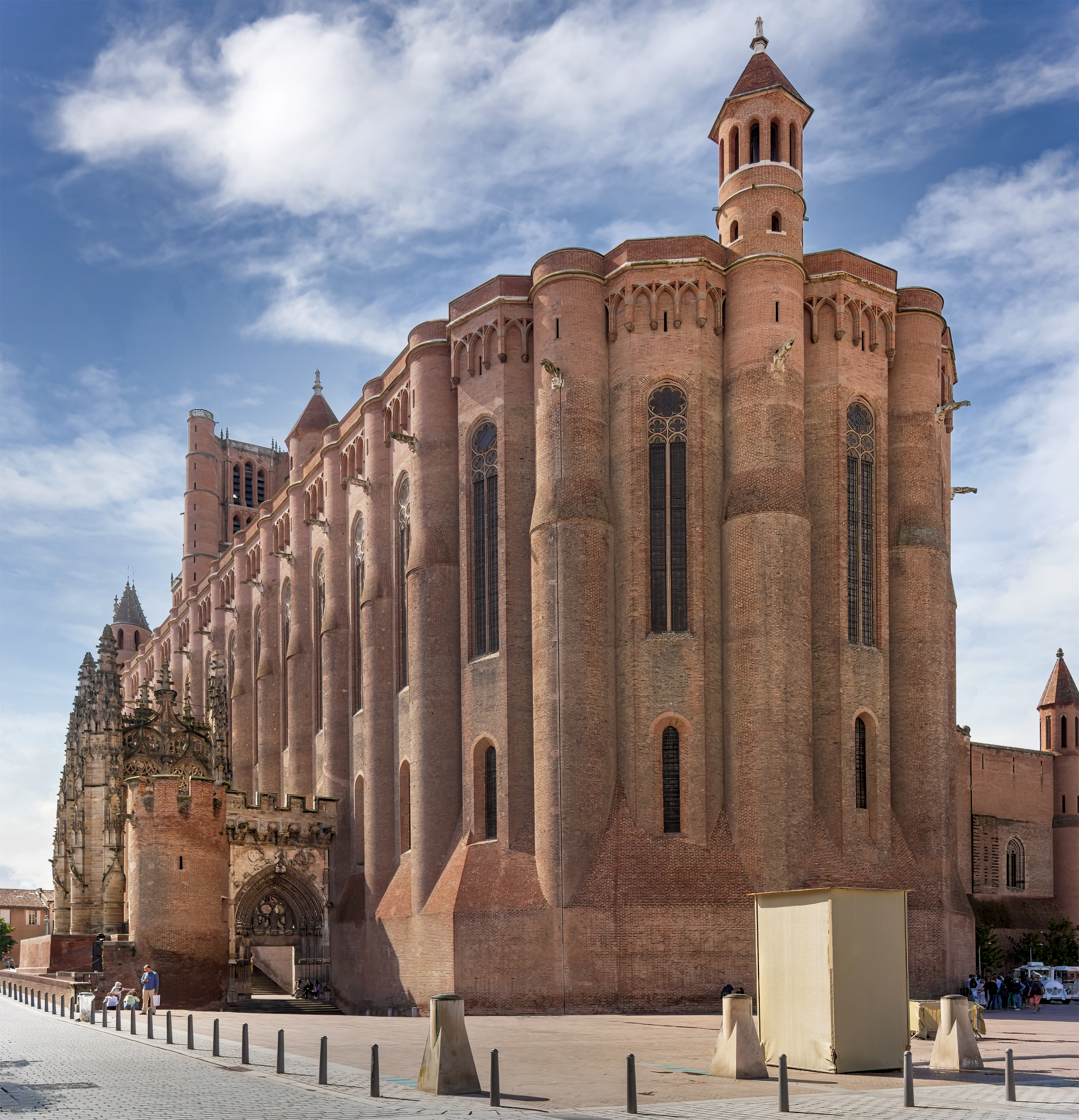
Albi Cathedral (1282–1480).

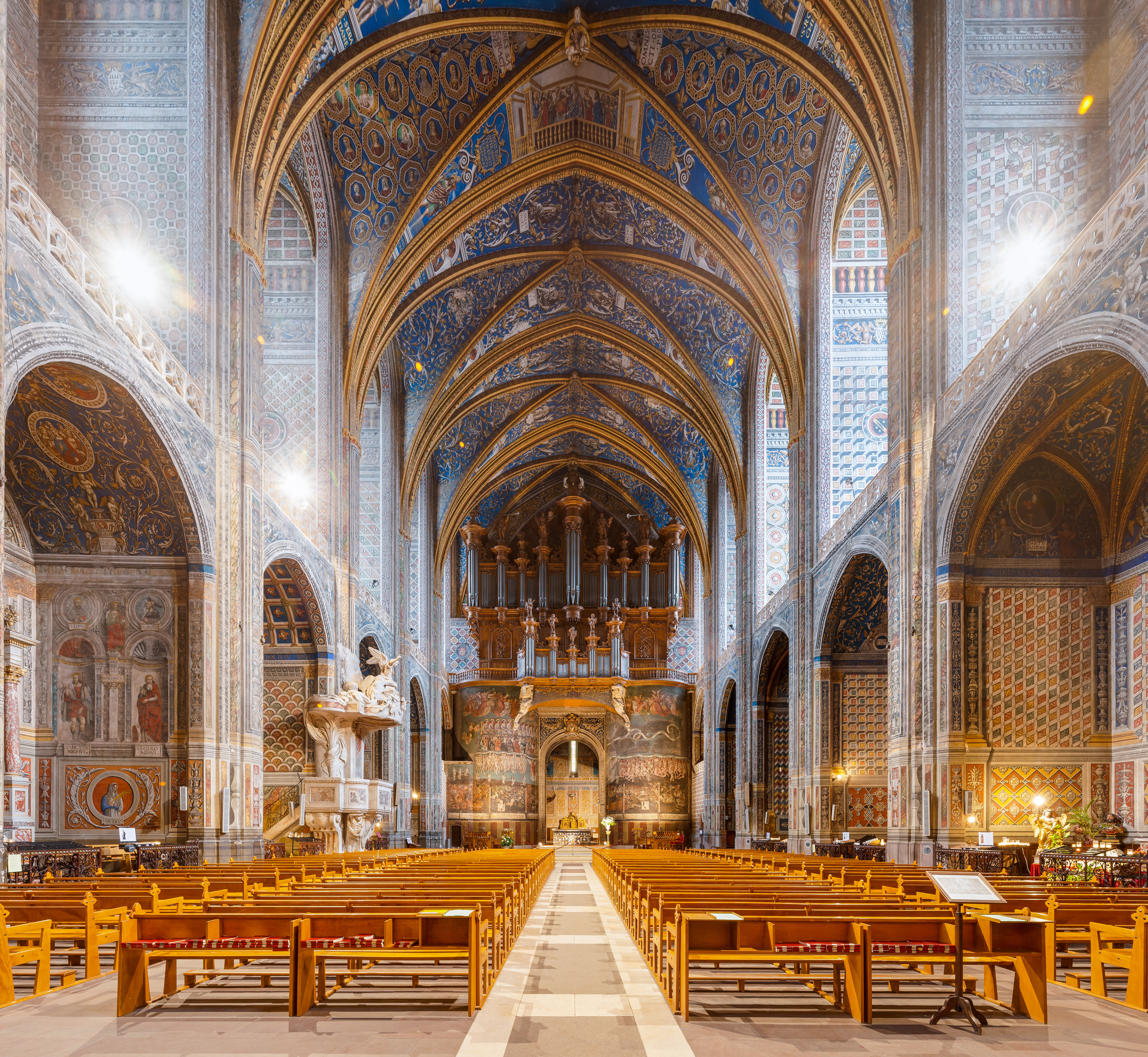
Nave of Albi Cathedral

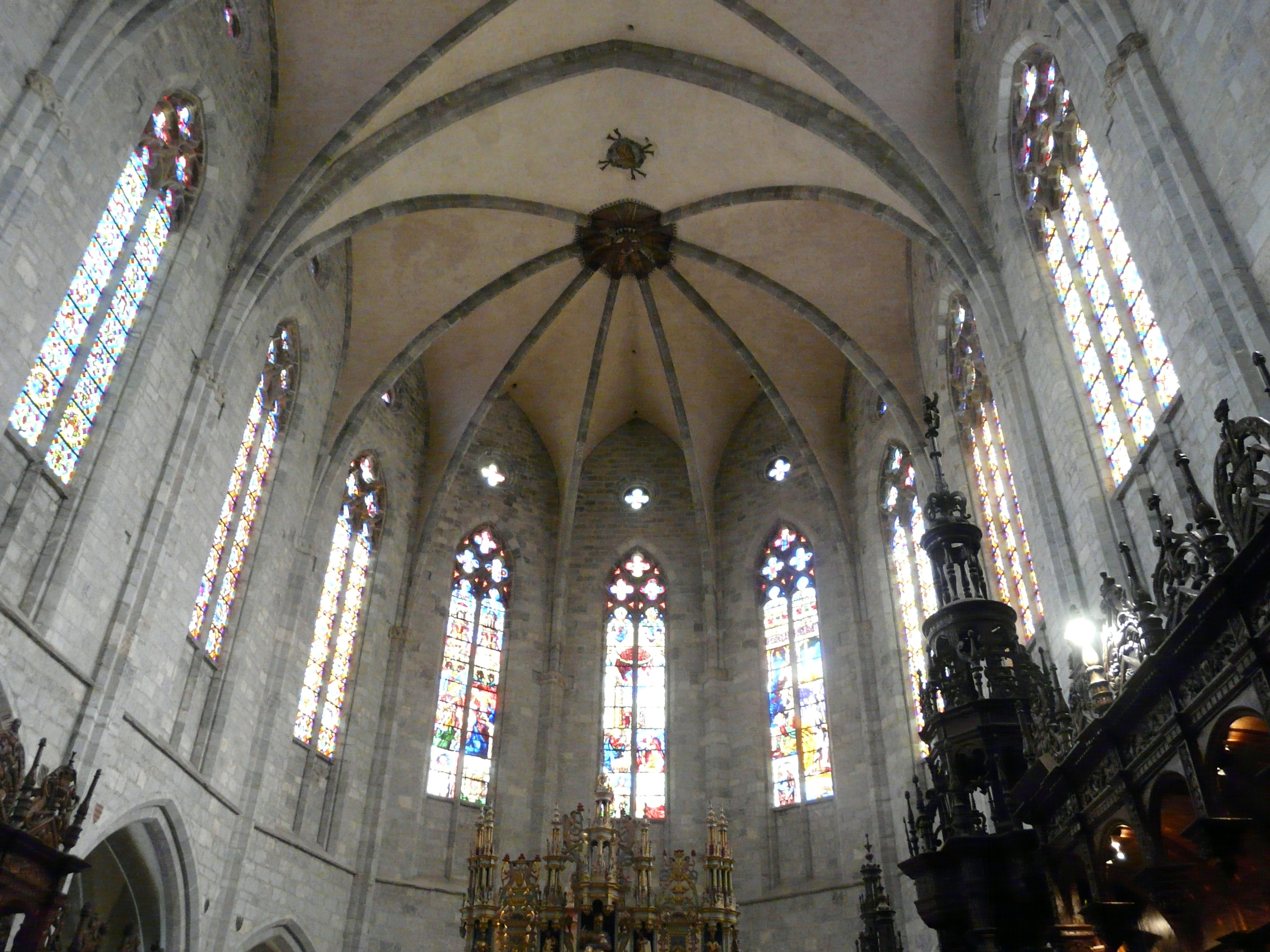
Choir of Saint-Bertrand-de-Comminges Cathedral (1304–1352).

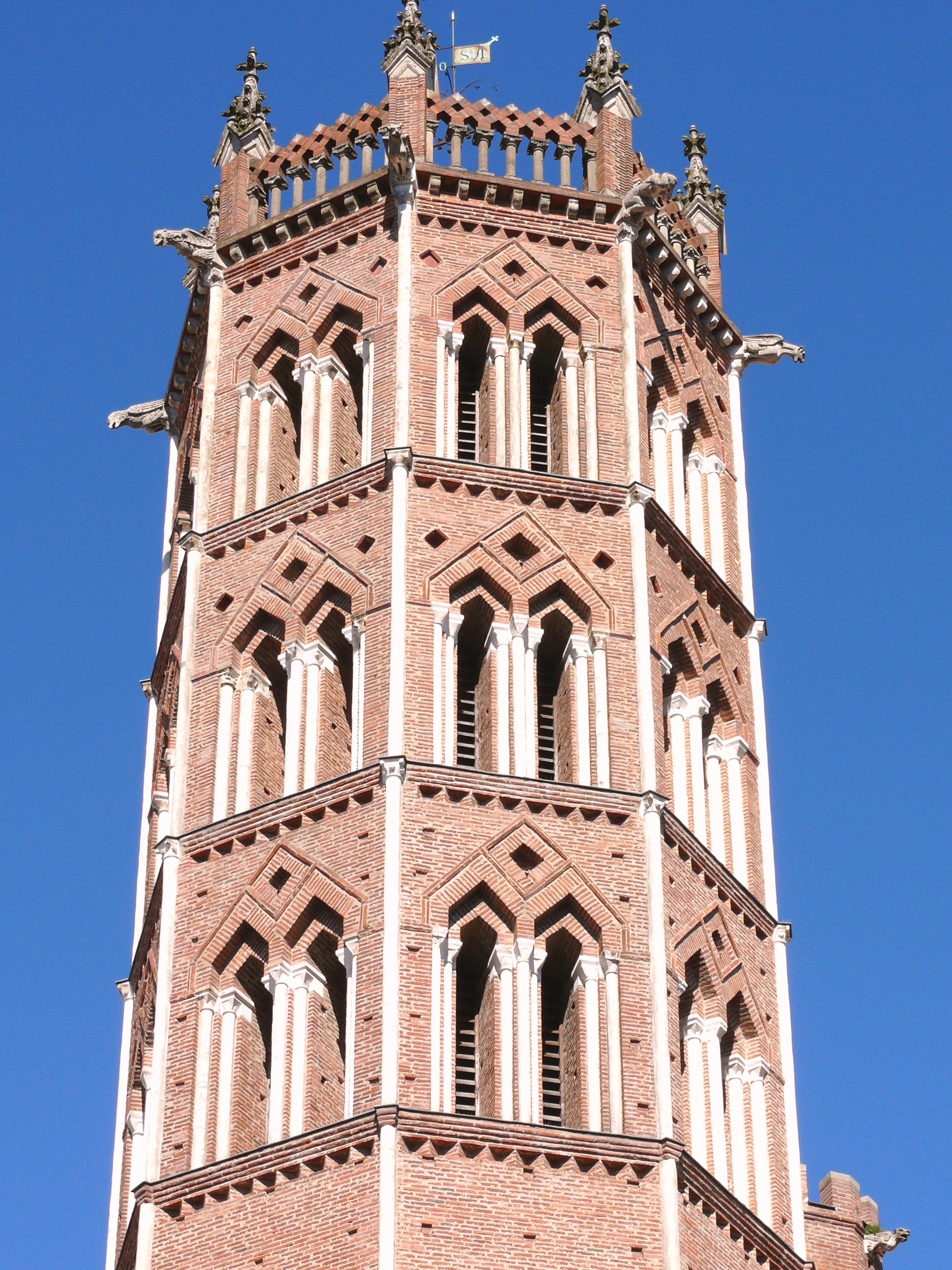
Bell tower of Pamiers Cathedral, with mitred arches.

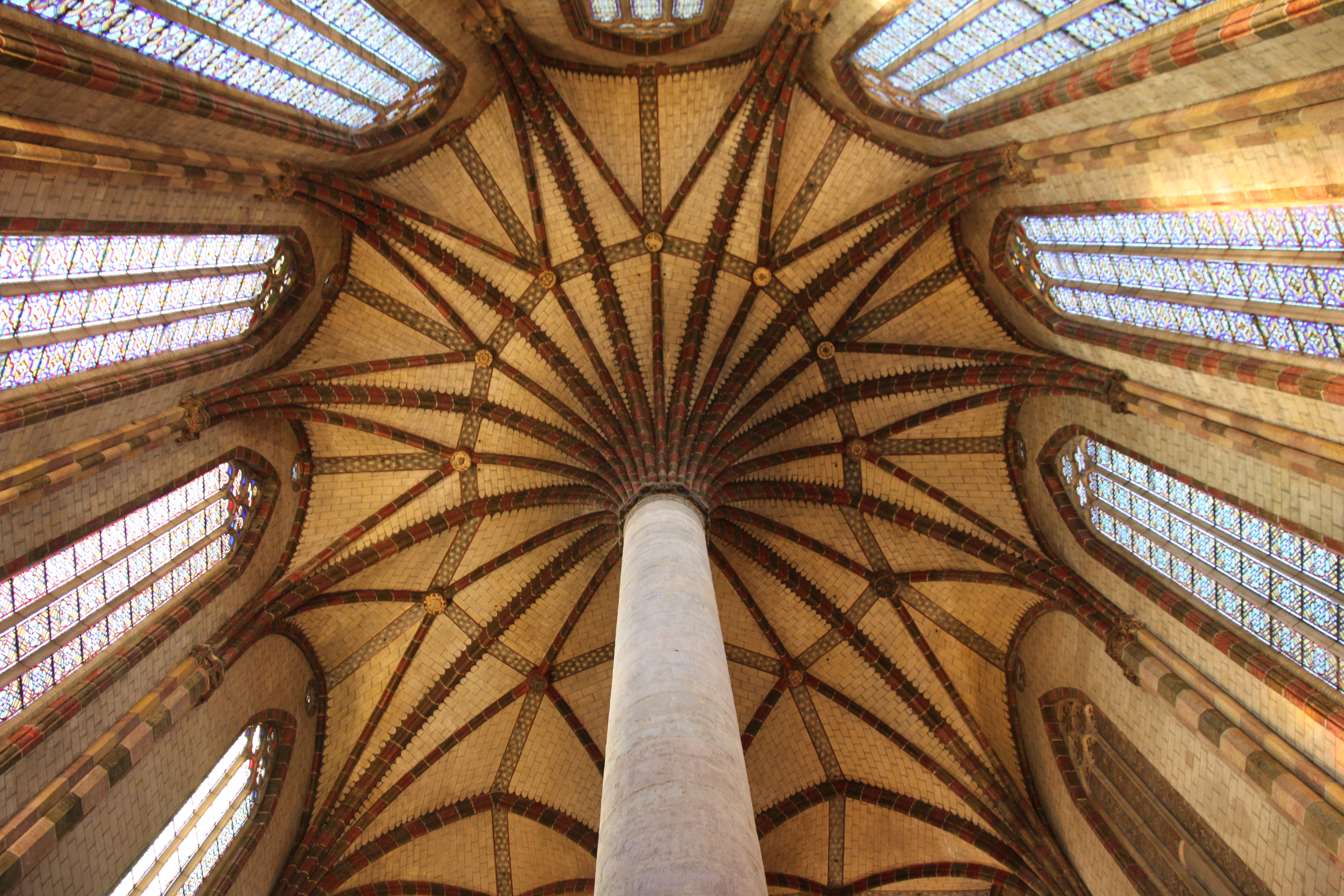
Palm vault of the Jacobins church in Toulouse, 1292.

Southern Gothic, also known as Toulouse Gothic or Languedoc Gothic, developed in southern France following the victory of the French Crown and the Catholic Church over the Cathars in the Albigensian Crusade (1220-29). After the political eradication of the Cathar aristocracy, it remained necessary to reconquer people's minds. In addition to the establishment of the Inquisition, the reassertion of Catholic control led to the construction of many Gothic churches and other buildings. The Cathars had strongly opposed the luxury of the Roman Catholic Church, and an architectural style more austere and restrained than that of northern France was therefore favoured. This original style was conceived as a militant architecture, an important weapon of the Church in its struggle against Cathar dissent. Preaching was an important tool against Catharism, and for this reason the aisleless nave was favoured, for the congregation to see and hear the preacher better. However, the presence of a single nave is not necessarily connected with this intention, and may result from other considerations or from the prior existence of a single nave. These naves were flanked by side chapels instead of aisles, divided by internal buttress-walls.

Southern Gothic is characterised by an emphasis on massive, plain walls, frequently of brick. Internal buttresses were used instead of flying buttresses, which combined with narrow windows to create a monolithic exterior, as at Albi Cathedral. This severe impression was reinforced by the lack of sculpture or moulding, which was difficult to achieve in brick. Pointed arches were also challenging to create, leading to the use of mitred (triangular-headed) arches as ornament. These arches were often applied to towers, which were generally octagonal in Tolouse. The martial appearance was further heightened by the use of machicolations and other forms of wallhead defence at the parapets. These architectural principles were applied to secular as well as sacred buildings, such as the Musée Saint-Raymond in Toulouse.

The style began with the aisleless rib-vaulted nave of Tolouse Cathedral (1210-20), which exhibits the Southern Gothic tendencies of brick, austerity and wall-buttressing. However, many buildings in the style are unvaulted, with timber roofs being carried by diaphragm arches. The style reached its height at Albi Cathedral (begun in 1282) and the Church of the Jacobins in Tolouse (1245-92); the latter is unusually divided by a central arcade into two parallel naves, which are joined by a palm-like vault at the apse.

== Central Europe ==
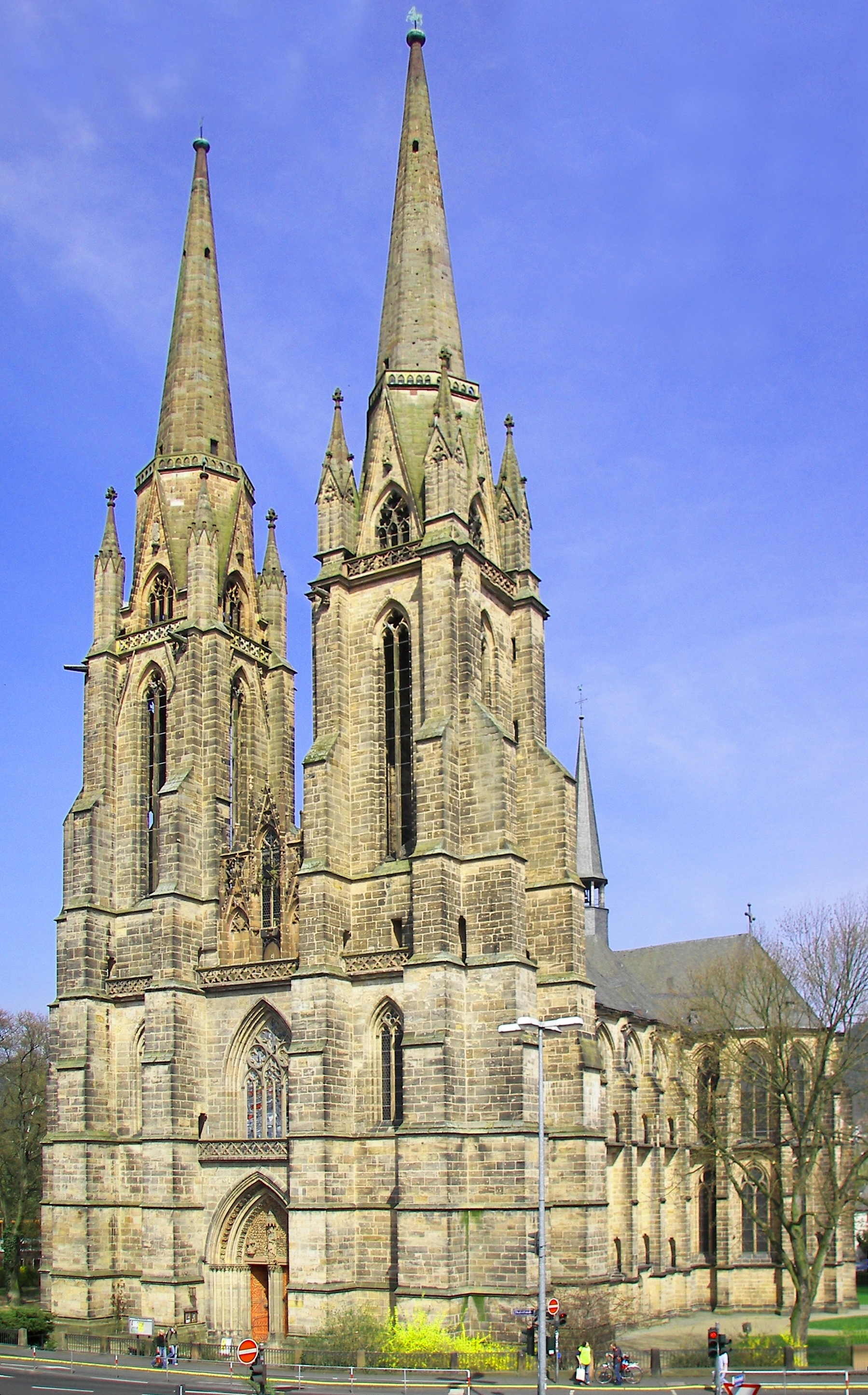
Elisabethkirche in Marburg, façade (1235)

There was an initial distrust in German-speaking countries regarding the new style coming from France. Since the time of Charlemagne, and later under the Ottonians and the Hohenstaufen, master builders of the western regions of the Empire — and particularly in the Rhine basin between Basel and Cologne — had developed an original architectural style of strong Romanesque matrix. The transition was slow, and initially buildings fused Gothic characteristics with elements that were still typically Romanesque, like Magdeburg Cathedral (1208) and Limburg Cathedral (1211–35). Fully-Gothic buildings began to appear in Germany in the 1230s, such as the Elisabethkirche, Marburg (begun 1235 or 1236) and the Liebfrauenkirche, Trier (c. 1233–83).

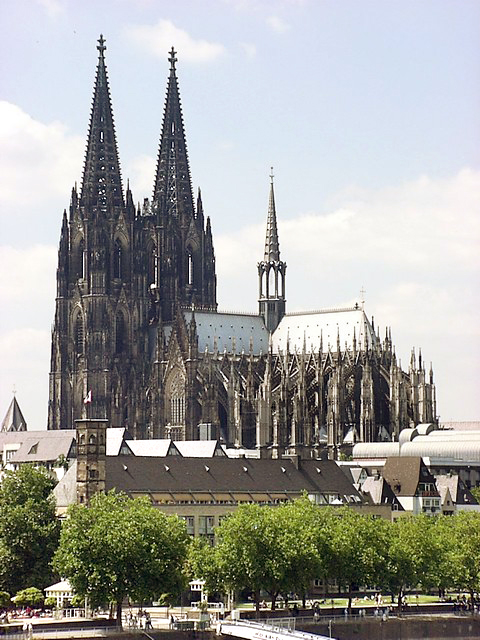
Cologne Cathedral, exterior (begun 1248)

Amiens Cathedral was the source of inspiration for Gerhard, the architect of Cologne Cathedral. Begun in 1248, its conception was extremely ambitious: the vaults rise above 43 metres. The choir was consecrated in 1322, but work progressed very slowly, only being completed in 1880, to the original designs.

The lengthy construction of Strasbourg Cathedral (which at the time was a city of the Empire) followed the artistic vicissitudes linked to the penetration of the Gothic style. The 12th century reconstruction initially followed late Romanesque lines, but the introduction of Parisian masons in the mid-13th century heralded a change to the Rayonnant style, of which the Strasbourg workshop soon became an important centre. The Rayonnant west front at Strasbourg exhibits harpstring tracery covering walls and windows alike, giving an intense verticality. This taste for tall and slender forms is also noticeable in Regensburg Cathedral (1285), and in the Sainte-Chapelle-inspired choir of Aachen Cathedral (begun in 1355).

Late German Gothic is distinguished by hall churches (Hallenkirchen), in which the aisles are the same height as the nave, so there is no clerestory. An example is the Wiesenkirche, Soest, built around 1330, which has a square plan in which the nave is not structurally separated from the choir, while the slender arcade piers rise straight to the vaults.

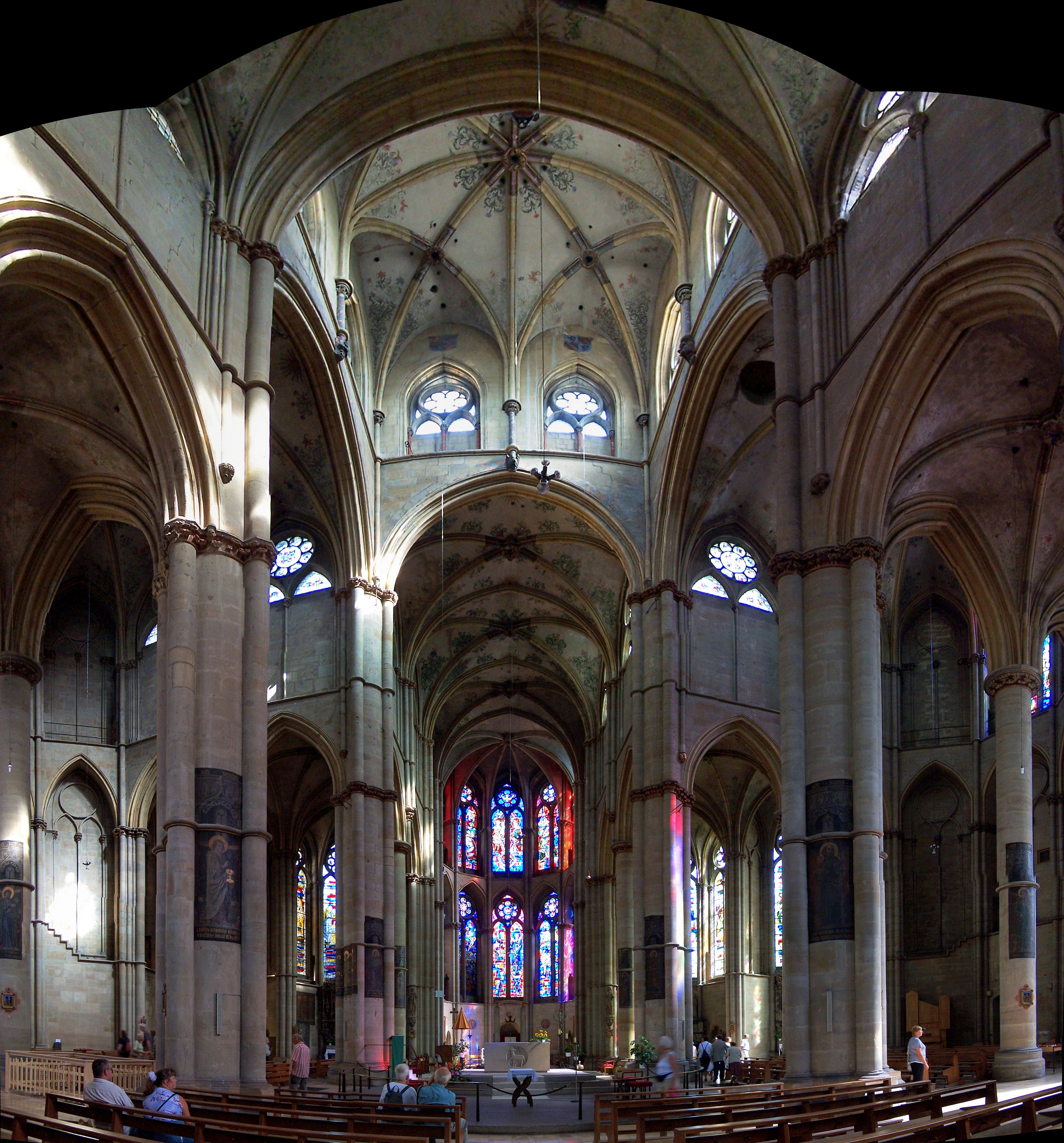
Liebfrauenkirche, Trier (c.1233-83)

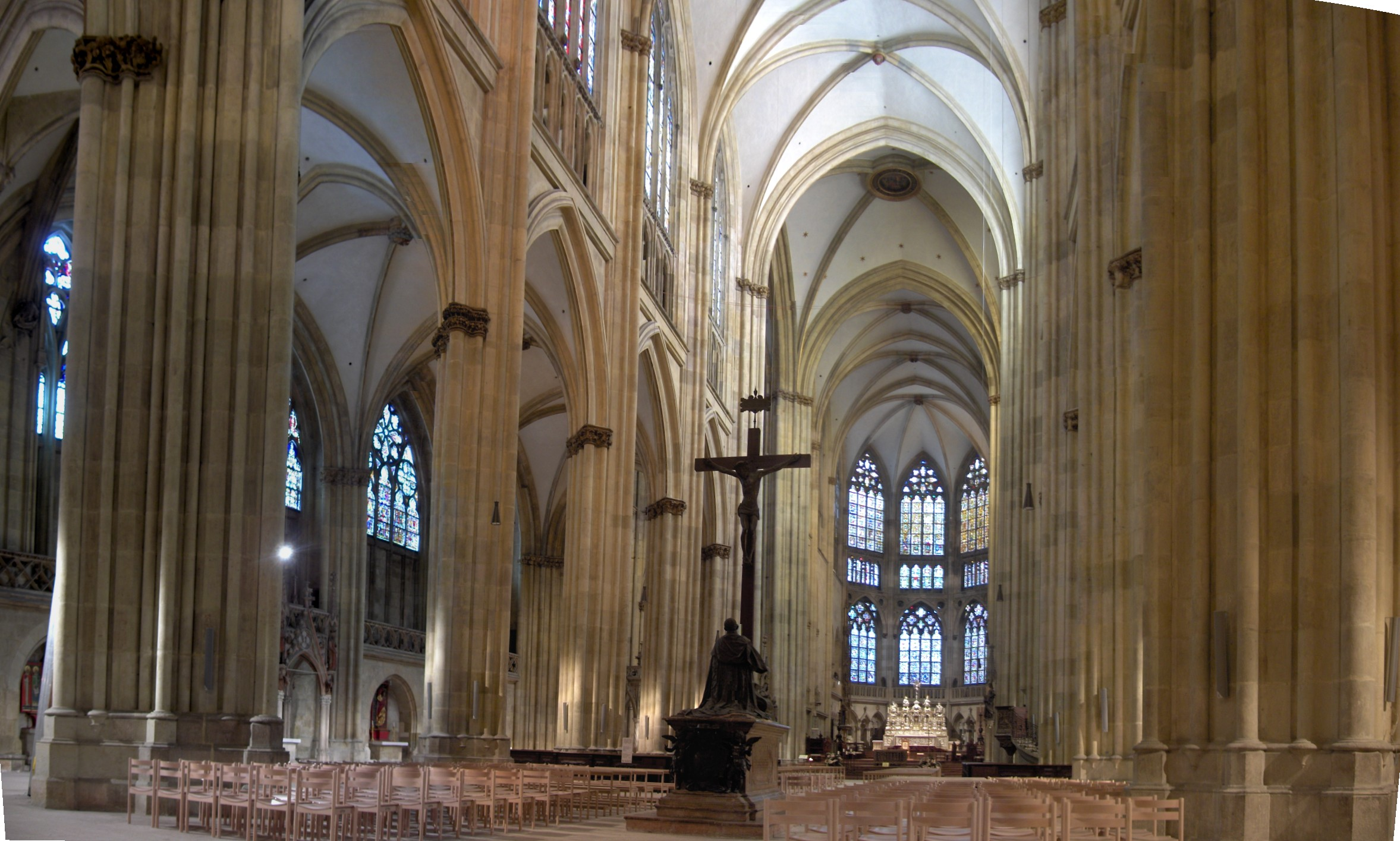
Regensburg Cathedral (13th century)

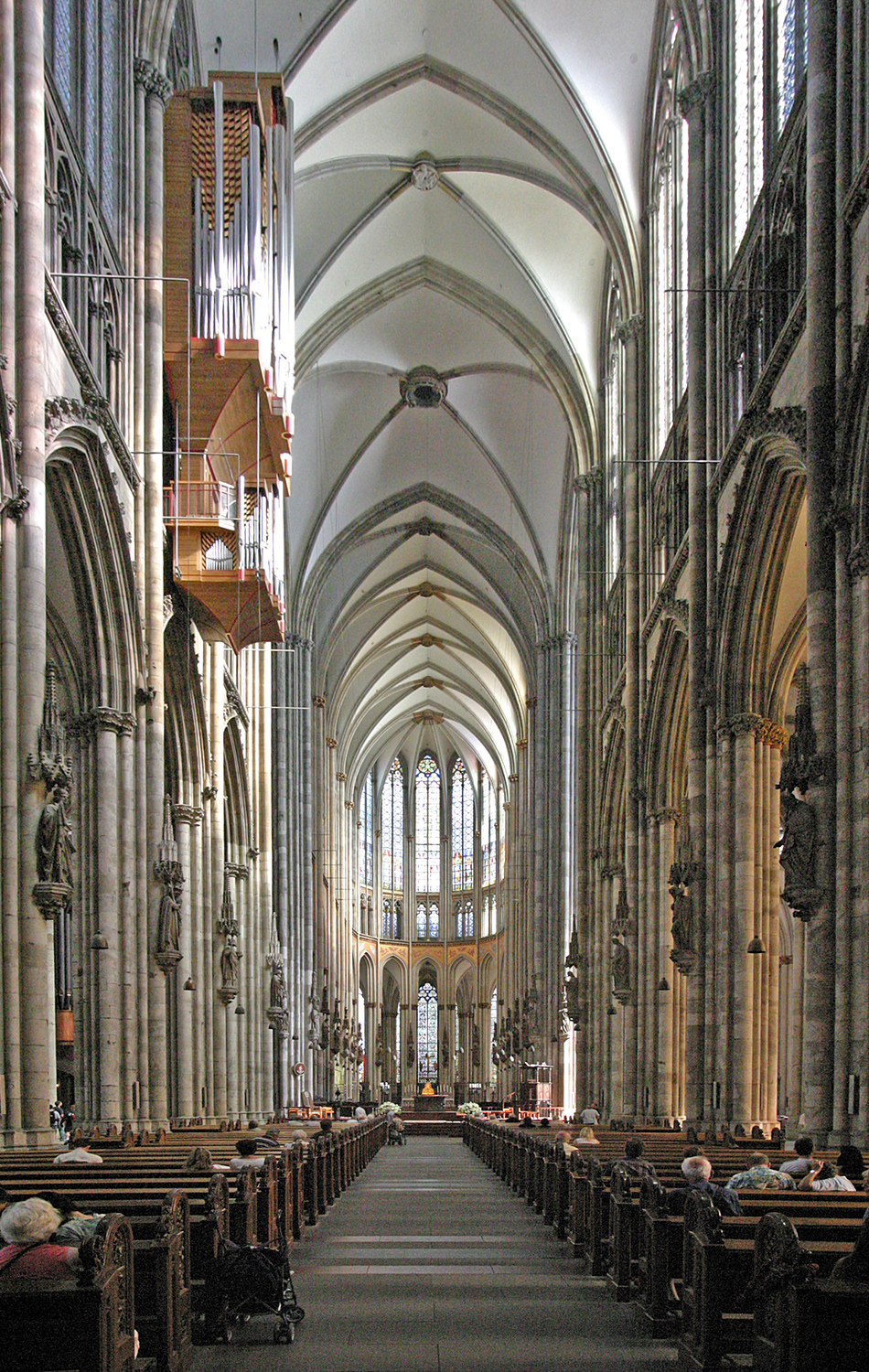
Cologne Cathedral (after 1248)

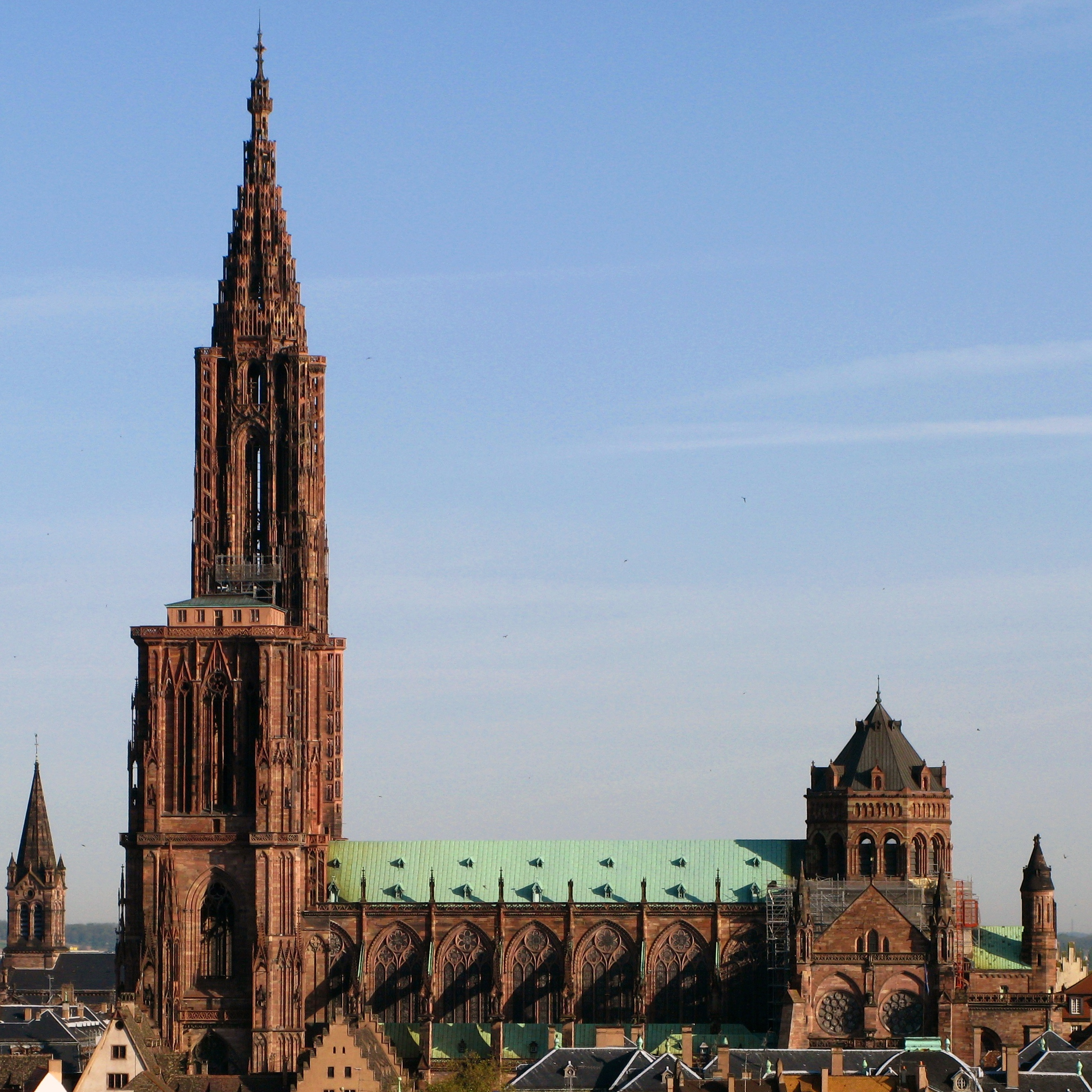
Strasbourg Cathedral (12th–15th centuries)

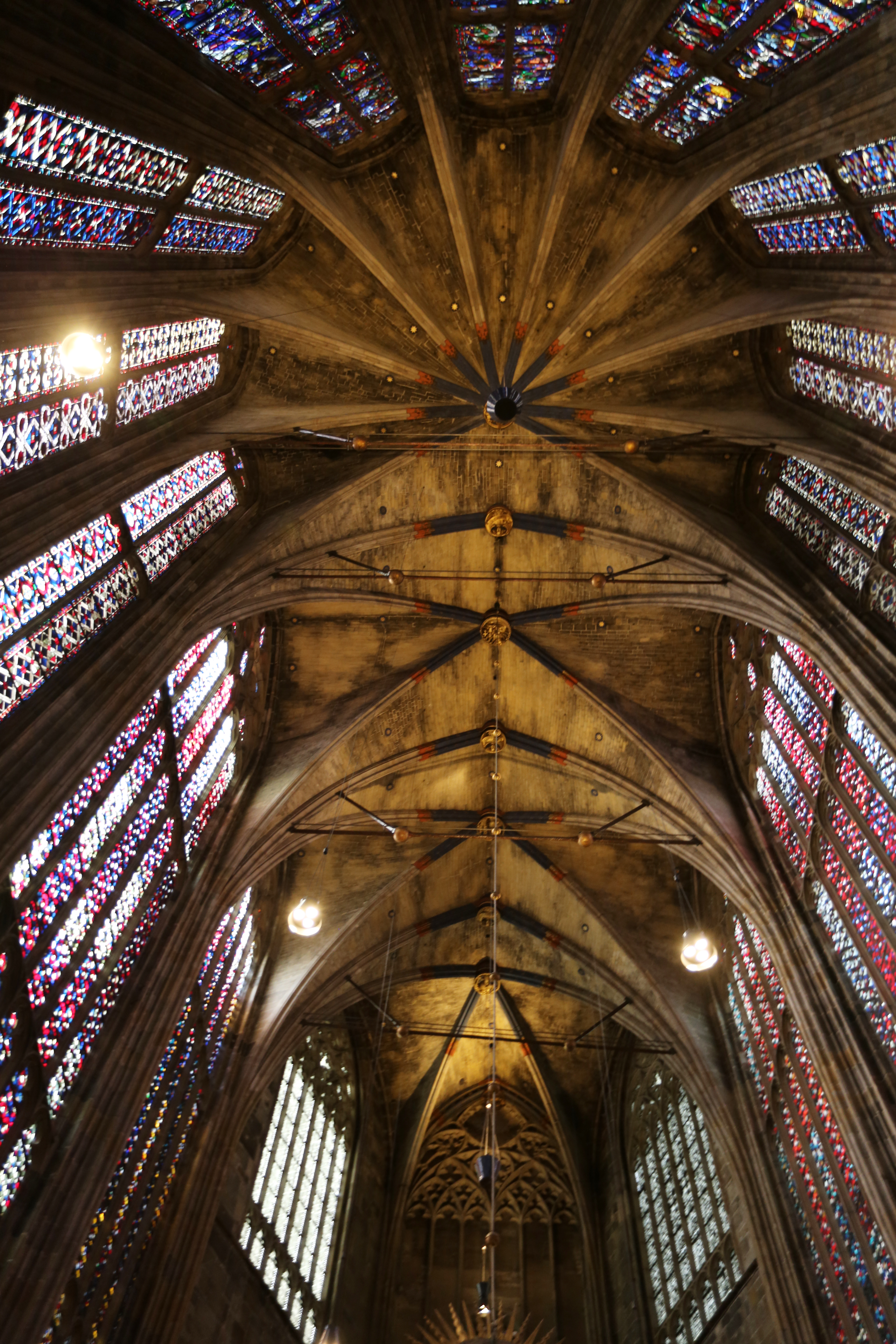
Aachen Cathedral, choir (1355)

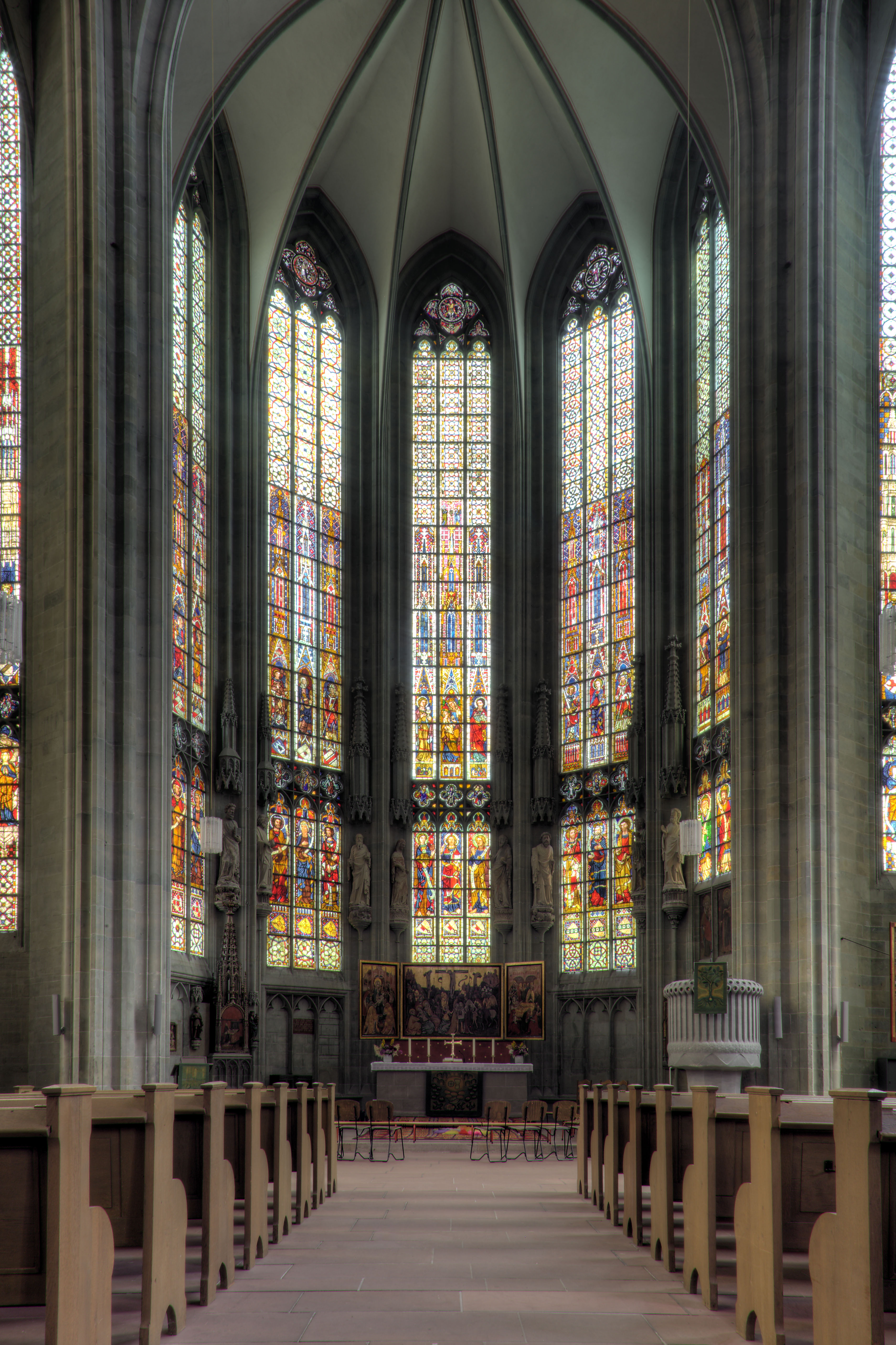
Wiesenkirche, Soest (c. 1330)

=== Swabia and Bohemia ===
Holy Cross, Schwäbisch-Gmünd (1320)

In Swabia and Bohemia, the late Gothic is linked to the Parler family of masons. The patriarch was Heinrich I the Elder, whose descendants extended their artistic influence across a large part of Bohemia, in the German-Austrian area, reaching as far as Brabant and Flanders. Their works are characterised by complex articulation of walls and vaults, but are not similar enough to be considered a distinct style.

Heinrich Parler and his son Peter both worked at the parish church of the Holy Cross in Schwäbisch-Gmünd (1320), in Swabia, reviving the model of the hall church based on the simplicity of the mendicant orders, but with innovative solutions in the choir (begun in 1350).

St. Vitus Cathedral, Prague: choir showing lierne vault and undulating walls.

Peter Parler, in particular, was one of the great protagonists of the Late Gothic. In 1356, he was summoned to Prague by Emperor Charles IV to complete St. Vitus Cathedral, begun in 1344 by the French architect Mathieu d'Arras. Charles had made Prague the capital of the Empire and wanted to expand it with an ambitious plan, which included a Gothic palace, Karlstejn Castle, and buildings for the new University of Prague.

While working on St. Vitus, Parler broke the fluid rhythm of the ambulatory, added the monumental square-plan chapel dedicated to Saint Wenceslas, and crowned the interiors with a pioneering net vault, suggesting an awareness of English Decorated developments. Parler also worked on the construction of the All Saints' Chapel on the Hradčany hill (using the Sainte-Chapelle as a model), the famous Charles Bridge over the Vltava (1357), the choir of Kolín (1360), and the Frauenkirche in Nuremberg.

Peter Parler's family members were active throughout Europe: Wenzel was architect of the cathedral of Vienna (1400–1404), Johann IV worked on the choir of Kutná Hora, and Heinrich III was at the construction site of Milan Cathedral in 1392. Many builders drew inspiration from them, such as Ulrich von Ensingen (who designed the enormous tower of Ulm Minster, begun in 1377, and worked on the facade of Strasbourg). At the end of the 14th century, the Parler style was also adapted to the brick churches of the north, as in Stargard and Brandenburg.

=== Brick Gothic ===
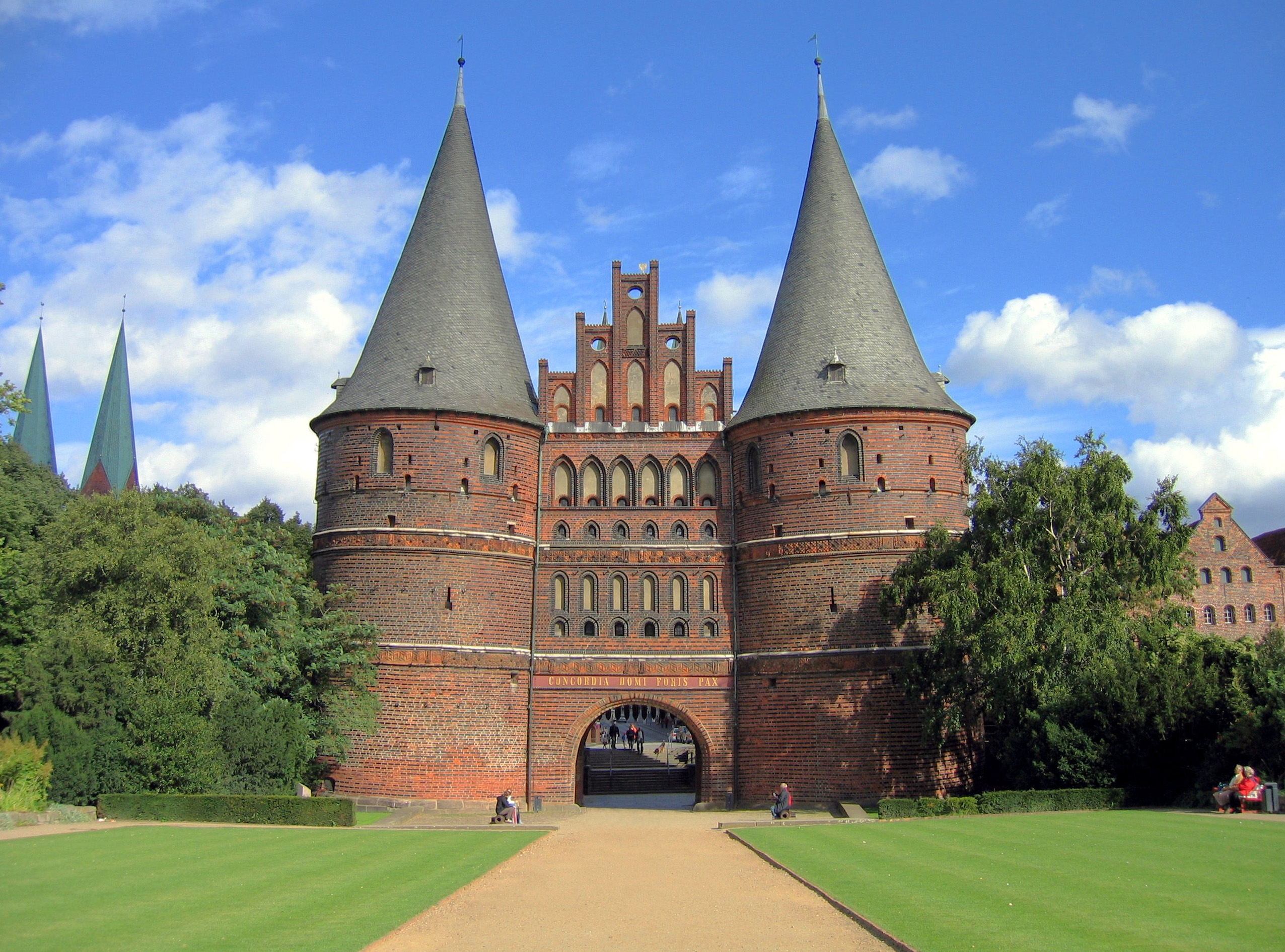
Holstentor city gate, Lübeck (1464-78)

In the northern Hanseatic and Baltic cities (such as Northern Germany and Poland), the lack of local stone led to the creation of a Gothic style based on brick, called Backsteingotik (Brick Gothic). The builders combined this less easily-worked material with the elevation and lightness of French Gothic, simplifying its forms without sacrificing ornamentation. The main examples of this style include St. Mary's Church in Lübeck (1250–1350), St. Mary's Church in Gdańsk (1379–1502), St. Mary's Basilica in Kraków (1290–1365), and Malbork Castle (13th century). The style was not limited only to religious architecture: entire urban plans were laid out according to the Gothic style of the Hanseatic regions, with the construction of civil and public buildings, such as the Holstentor gate in Lübeck, and structures in Chorin, Prenzlau, and Stralsund. In eastern Germany, Poland and the Baltic, the style is particularly associated with the Teutonic Knights.

=== The Low Countries ===
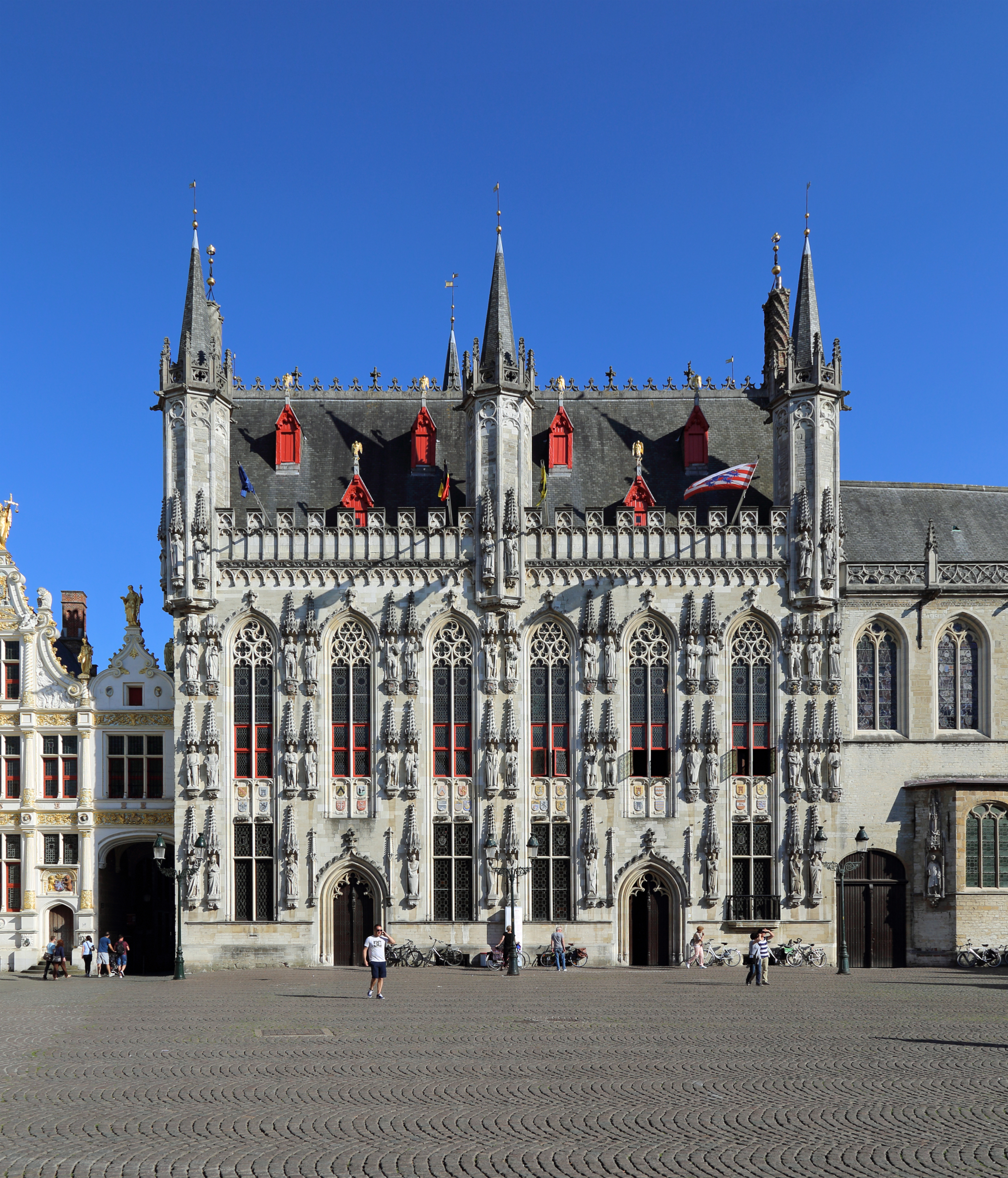
Bruges City Hall (1377-1387)

In the Middle Ages, present-day Belgium and the Netherlands were part of the sphere of artistic influence of the Diocese of Cologne and France. However, it is in civil and public architecture that the Gothic style of this region reached its apogee. From the late 13th century onwards, the area of Flanders and Brabant was at the centre of a very rich commercial and textile network. The wealth of the bourgeoisie favoured the development of civic life, which manifested itself in grandiose buildings decorated in ashlar masonry: the hallen (large markets and merchandise warehouses) and town halls. To symbolise secular power, these civic buildings were endowed with towering belfries ('beffrois'), matching the scale of the great cathedrals. The Schepenhuis, Aalst (1225) was the typological reference point for town halls, with its corner turrets and continuous row of windows. The town halls of Bruges and Brussels present similar schemes, but with ornately decorated facades, a taste for late-Gothic detail also visible in the palaces of Mons (1458), Ghent (1518), Leuven (1448) and Oudenaarde (1526–1536).

Brabantine Gothic was characterised by the use of pale sandstone or limestone (which allowed for very meticulous carved details), columns with capitals of stylised foliage (such as cabbage leaves), and sometimes timber ceilings due to unstable soil conditions. Notable examples include the Church of Our Lady of the Sablon in Brussels (15th century), the Cathedral of St. Michael and St. Gudula (also in Brussels, begun in the 13th century), and the Grote Kerk, Haarlem, with its monumental wooden ceiling (c. 1479).

== Southern Europe ==
=== Italy ===
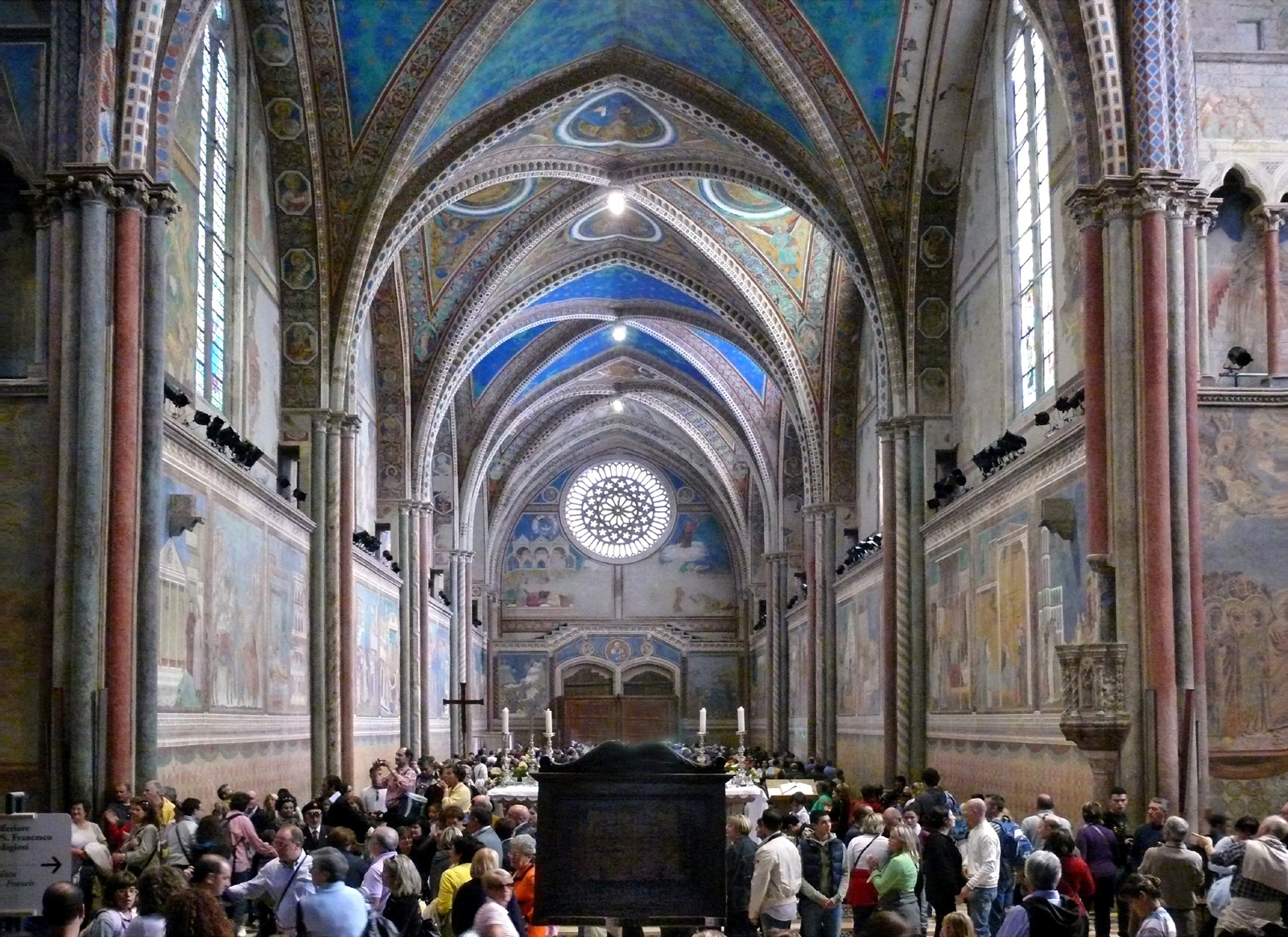
Upper Basilica of Assisi, interior (1228–1239)

Notwithstanding the early Norman experiemnts with pointed arches in Sicily, the Gothic style arrived late in Italy and failed to take deep root due to the strong classical tradition present in the peninsula. Italian Gothic architecture was deeply influenced by the geopolitics of its city-states and the materials available in different regions: marble was available in large quantities in Tuscany, being generously used for surface cladding, while its scarcity in Lombardy induced the extensive use of brick. Many northern European architectural elements were rejected or profoundly subverted, reflecting architectural choices associated with Italian urban traditions and a detachment from the Île-de-France cathedral model. Thus, instead of dissolving the wall into an abstract structural system dominated by glass, Italian architecture preserved the mass and flatness of the wall, covering it with frescoes. The persistence of architectural solutions distinct from French cathedrals should not be understood as passive resistance or technical delay, but as an expression of Italian political and institutional structures. The monumental architecture of urban communes, the papacy, and the empire developed their own languages that hardly aligned with the model of centralised territorial monarchies of northern Europe.

The Cistercian monastic order played an important role in the initial diffusion of Burgundian Gothic in early 13th century Italy, as seen in Fossanova Abbey (consecrated in 1208) and Casamari Abbey (1203–1217). Although they followed the basic plan of Gothic Cistercian churches in Burgundy, particularly Cîteaux Abbey, the Cistercians also adopted local features.

Among the earliest non-Cistercian examples of Gothic architecture is the Basilica of Saint Francis of Assisi (1228–1239). It is an extremely original building, without clear precedent. It has a simple plan of an aisleless Latin cross, with large expanses of wall adorned with frescoes by Cimabue and Giotto. Unusually, the whole building is raised above a substantial lower church. The basilica of San Francesco, Bologna (1236-63), follows a more orthodox Gothic plan, with aisles and a chevet with radiating chapels. However, its simple elevation lacks the triforium usual elsewhere in Europe. Both these churches belonged to the mendicant friars, who exerted a major influence on Italian Gothic, favouring large, simple buildings with widely-spaced piers that were suited to preaching. These characteristics continued in the later 13th century, at the churches of Santa Maria Novella (Dominican, begun in 1279) and Santa Croce (Franciscan, begun in 1294), both in Florence. Santa Croce is unvaulted, but at Santa Maria Novella the steeply-arched vault obviates the need for large buttresses.

Florence Cathedral nave, looking west (begun in 1296)

Cathedral architecture tended to be more conservative, with round arches continuing to be used at Siena and Orvieto into the 14th century. In the latter case, this was not mere backwardness, but a deliberate evocation of early Christian basilicas, with solemn arcades and a timber ceiling, to reflect papal patronage. This was not the case, however at Florence Cathedral (begun in 1296). This used pointed arches and rib vaults throughout, but retained the Italian lack of verticality, with no triforium, a strong cornice above the nave arcade and pronounced horizontal divisions in Giotto's campanile. Like other Italian Cathedrals, Florence's crossing was to be covered with a dome instead of a tower, although in this case the proposed span was so large that no one was able to erect it until Brunelleschi in the 15th century. The campanile and baptistery are separate to the main body ot the cathedral, another Italian characteristic. Some buildings abandoned the general austerity, such as the tiny Santa Maria della Spina in Pisa (c.1330), which is encrusted with extravagant jewel box-like decoration. Venetian masons were similarly unreserved, using exotic ogee arches and other forms derived from trade with the East. Ornament was concentrated on the liturgical west façade, which was not always actually to the west in Italy. This decoration could include polychromatic marble cladding and prothyri (open porches) emphasising the main portal. Portals were also beautified with sculpted broze doors, like those by Andrea Pisano at Florence Baptistery (1330-36). Traceried windows were less common than simple oculi, some of which could reach a great size, as at Siena and Orvieto. From the mid-13th century, figure sculpture became more realistic, as in the works of Nicola and Giovanni Pisano at Pisa and Siena.

Milan Cathedral, east end (after 1387)

Milan Cathedral was Italy's only attempt to build along northern Eauropean lines, beginning in 1387. The scale was such that masters from across Europe were called in to discuss its structural feasibility, and work was only completed in 1858. The plan has a developed chevet and transepts, while the column capitals take the unusual form of ædicules containing statues.

The Palazzo Publico, Siena

Italy's prosperity, derived in part from its position at the centre of European finance, enabled the development of civic architecture. This was especially significant due to its political fragmentation into rival city-states, which competed to have the most impressive civic buildings. These buildings were distinguished by their tall, slender belfries, often with machicolations. Examples include the Palazzo Publico in Siena (1298-1348) and the Palazzo Vecchio in Florence (1299-1314). Palaces were also erected for feudal leaders, from the Roman-influenced Castel del Monte, Apulia (1240s) to the exotic Doge's Palace, Venice (14th-15th centuries), with its two-floor loggia and pink-and-white marble facing.

=== Spain ===
==== Kingdom of Castile ====
In the Iberian Peninsula, French Gothic elements were introduced by the Cistercians in the second half of the 12th century. The earliest examples were the monasteries of Veruela, Poblet, and Santes Creus. Ribbed vaults were very early applied inside buildings of still fully Romanesque matrix, such as the Portico of Glory of the Santiago de Compostela Cathedral or Zamora Cathedral. The Gothic style in the Iberian Peninsula differs from the rest of Europe, the result of a transitional period in which the end of the Romanesque alternated with rare expressions of pure Gothic. In 1172, the French architect Giral Fruchel designed the fortified Ávila Cathedral, which fuses Romanesque and Gothic forms. Inspired by the Basilica of Saint-Denis, King Alfonso VIII of Castile demanded for Ávila a plan with radiating chapels and a double ambulatory. The cathedral is notable for its early use of flying buttresses.

In the 13th century, however, fundamental political changes had direct repercussions on Hispanic architecture. Muslims lost control of most of the peninsula: following the conquest of Seville in 1248, only the Kingdom of Granada remained under their domain. The kingdoms of Castile, Aragon, Portugal, and later Mallorca became the new Iberian powers. This was the time when the so-called Full Gothic (or High Gothic) arrived, and the cathedrals most closely linked to French and German Gothic - Toledo, Burgos and León - were erected. Spanish Gothic churches are comparatively wide and frequently feature very high arcades topped by low clerestories, giving them a spatiality similar to German hall churches. Some authors apply the qualifier "Gothic" with caution and favour the term "low medieval".

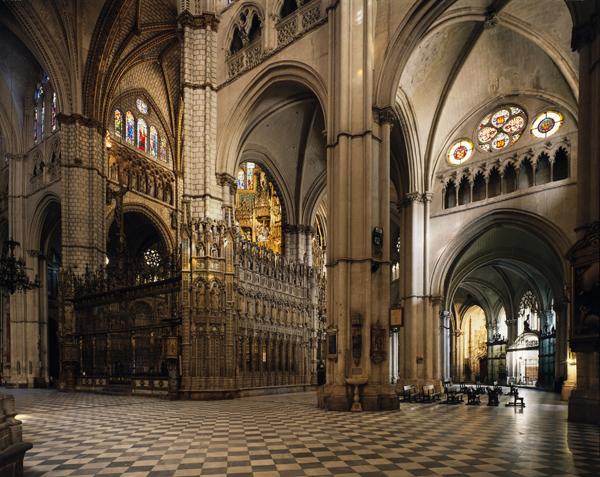
Toledo Cathedral, interior (after 1227)

The reconstruction of Toledo Cathedral was begun in 1227 by Archbishop Rodrigo Jiménez de Rada, but not completed until the 15th century. It exemplifies the richness of this period, erected over an old mosque and partially following its plan; the fusion of French Gothic with local elements generated a unique style. It features aisles of decreasing height, derived from Bourges Cathedral, but differs from its model in its marked horizontal expansion, use of a transept, quadripartite vaults and ornamentation. Some Mudéjar elements are also integrated, such as multifoiled arches and the decoration of the voussoirs and rose windows.

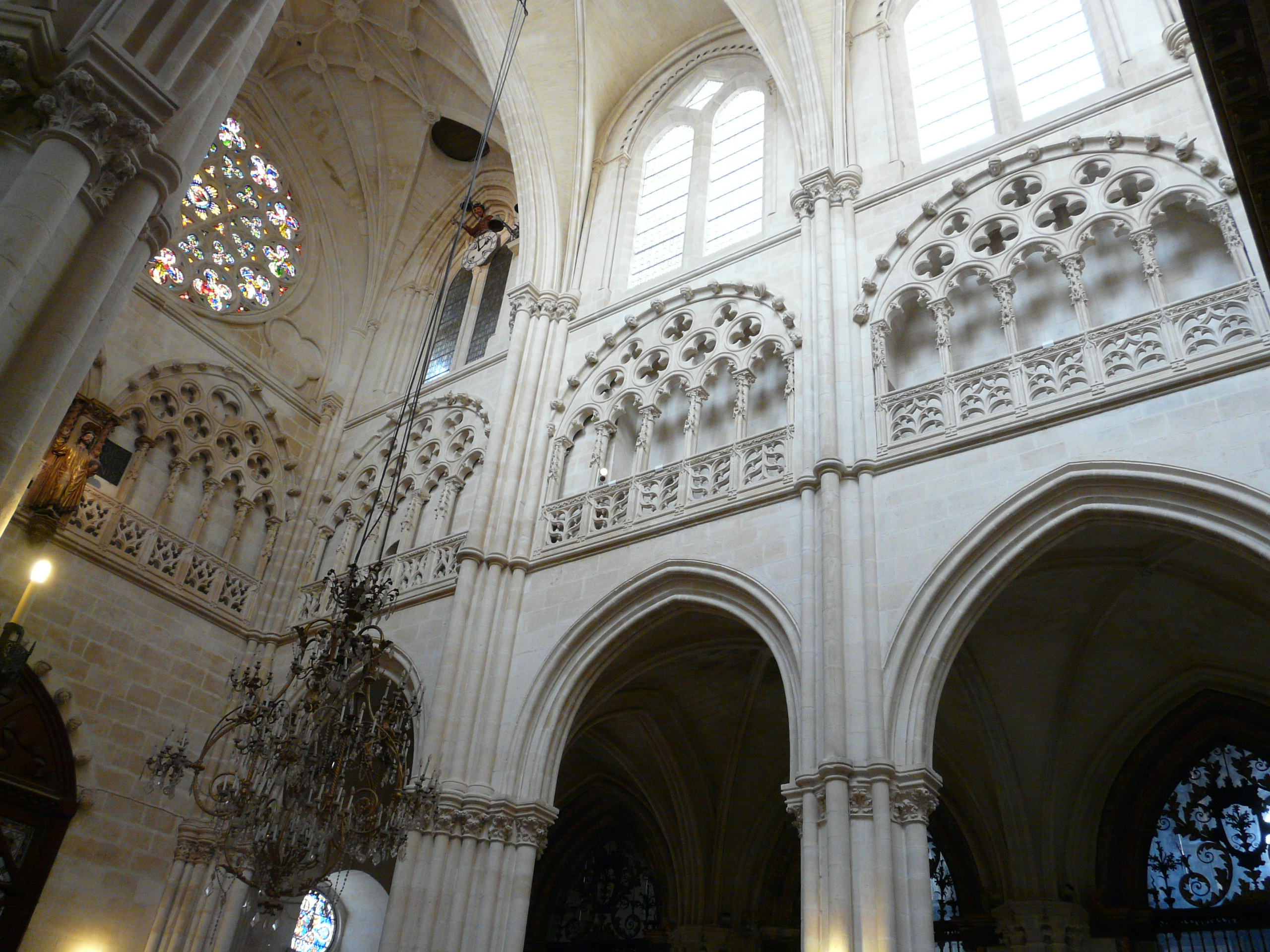
Burgos Cathedral, triforium (1260)

Burgos Cathedral is contemporary to Toledo: begun around 1221, it underwent multiple subsequent alterations, and was completed and consecrated in 1260. Due to its faster construction, it is more homogeneous than Toledo, with the choir positioned in the centre of the nave in the Spanish manner. Its lightness shows clear French influence, while the triforium again has Mudéjar influenced decoration.

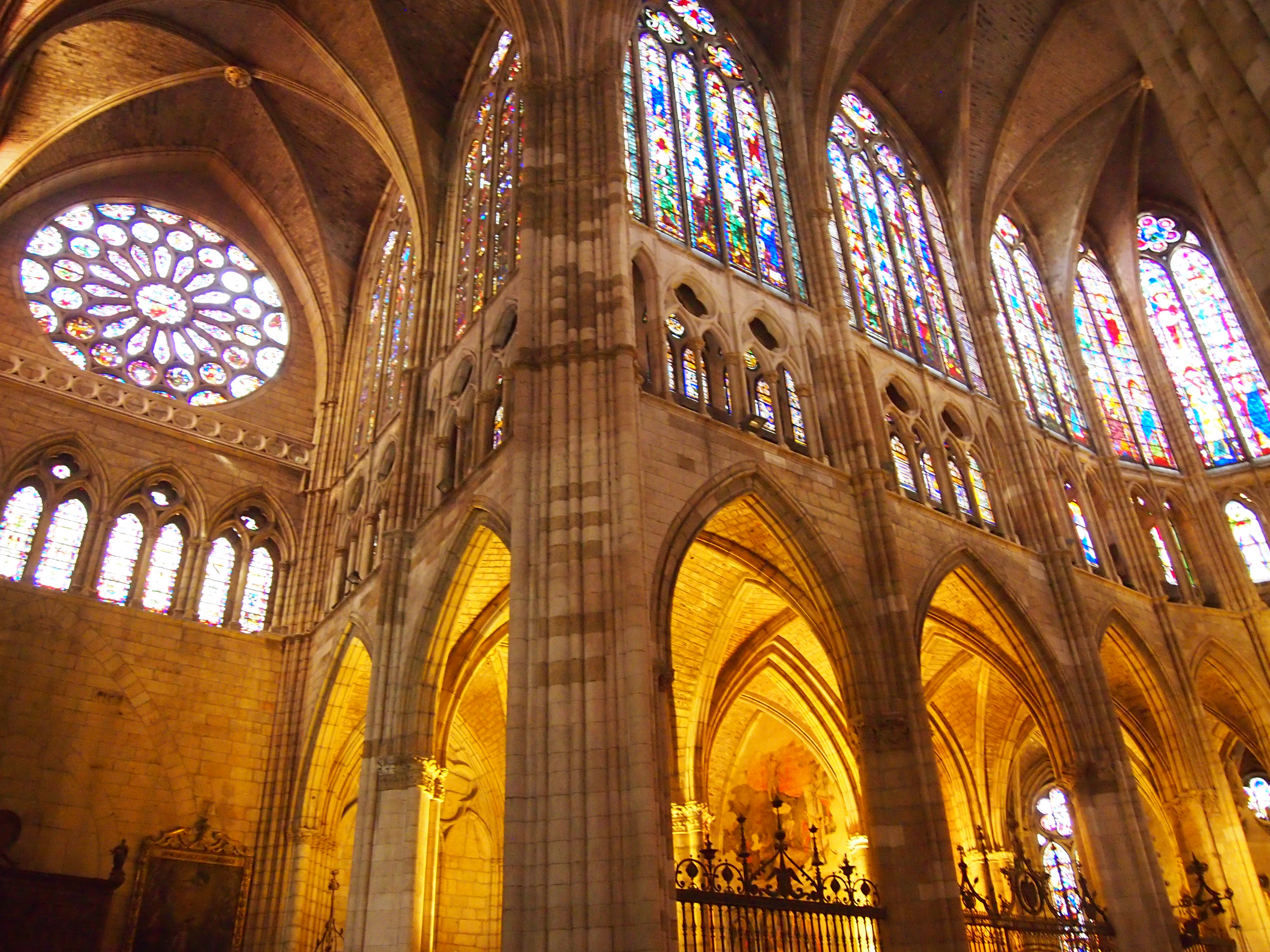
León Cathedral, interior (begun around 1255)

León Cathedral was supposedly begun around 1255. Its west façade resembles French models, although it is wider in proportion. The general plan follows Chartres, while the ambulatory with five radial chapels and the aisled transept were derived from Reims. The bar tracery and glazed triforium are Rayonnant in style, without the Moorish decoration of Toledo and Burgos. The general slenderness is similarly typical of the French Rayonnant, with shafts and clustered colonnettes rising to the vaults.

Many Iberian cathedrals are completely surrounded by chapels which are frequently stylistically diverse. In Oviedo Cathedral, the Chapter House (built between 1293 and 1314) exemplifies this diversity with its vaulting, using ribbed squinches to cover a square plan with an octagonal vault. The absence of an ambulatory in buildings such as Oviedo Cathedral was due to liturgical and functional reasons; if relics were kept in an independent building, a peripheral ambulatory lost its meaning.

==== Catalonia, the Balearic Islands, and Valencia ====
Architectural development in this region is inseparable from its political, social, and territorial reality. The monarchy, consolidated from the time of Ramon Berenguer IV and the union with the Kingdom of Aragon, determined the guidelines of ecclesiastical architecture and allied with the urban bourgeoisie and merchant aristocracy, driving institutional and urban growth. Gothic architecture began to be introduced under James I (1213–1276), who expanded the territory by conquering Mallorca and Valencia. The late 13th century saw major civic projects, including the city wall, royal palace and drassanes (shipyards, 1281) in Barcelona, and the municipal palace of La Paeria in Lleida.

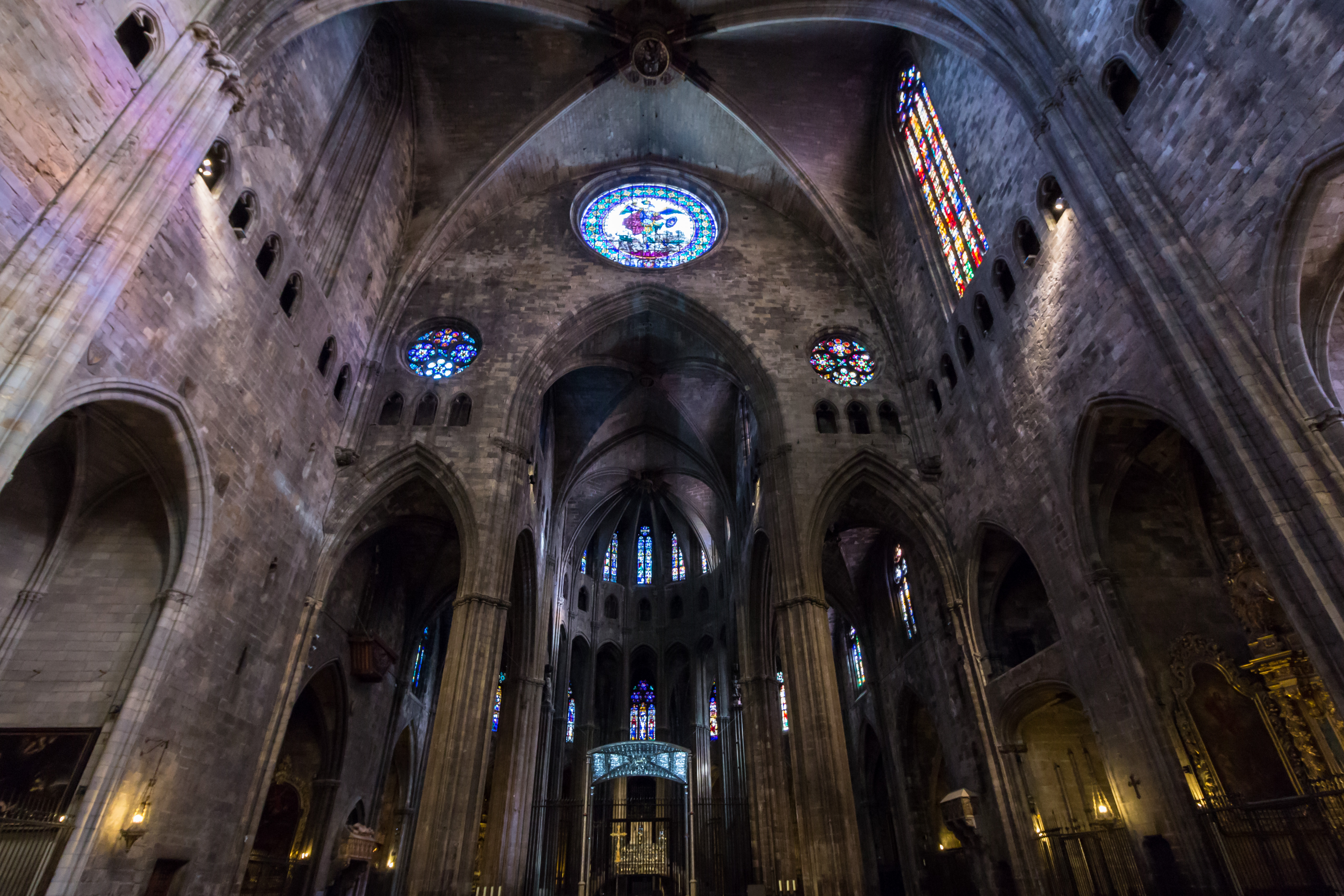
Girona Cathedral, looking from the aisleless nave to the aisled choir.

In the 14th century, several major churches were constructed in Barcelona, including the cathedral (begun in 1298), Santa Maria del Pi (begun c. 1320) and Santa Maria del Mar (1329-84). They shared an expansive mendicant-influenced spatiality, with very high arcades, small clerestory windows and internal wall buttresses between side-chapels. Girona Cathedral was begun along similar lines in 1312, but the design was changed in the 15th century to produce an even more unified space, with a single vault (the widest Gothic vault in the world) covering the width of both nave and aisles, supported by massive buttresses between the side chapels. The junction between the two sections is masked by three large rose windows.

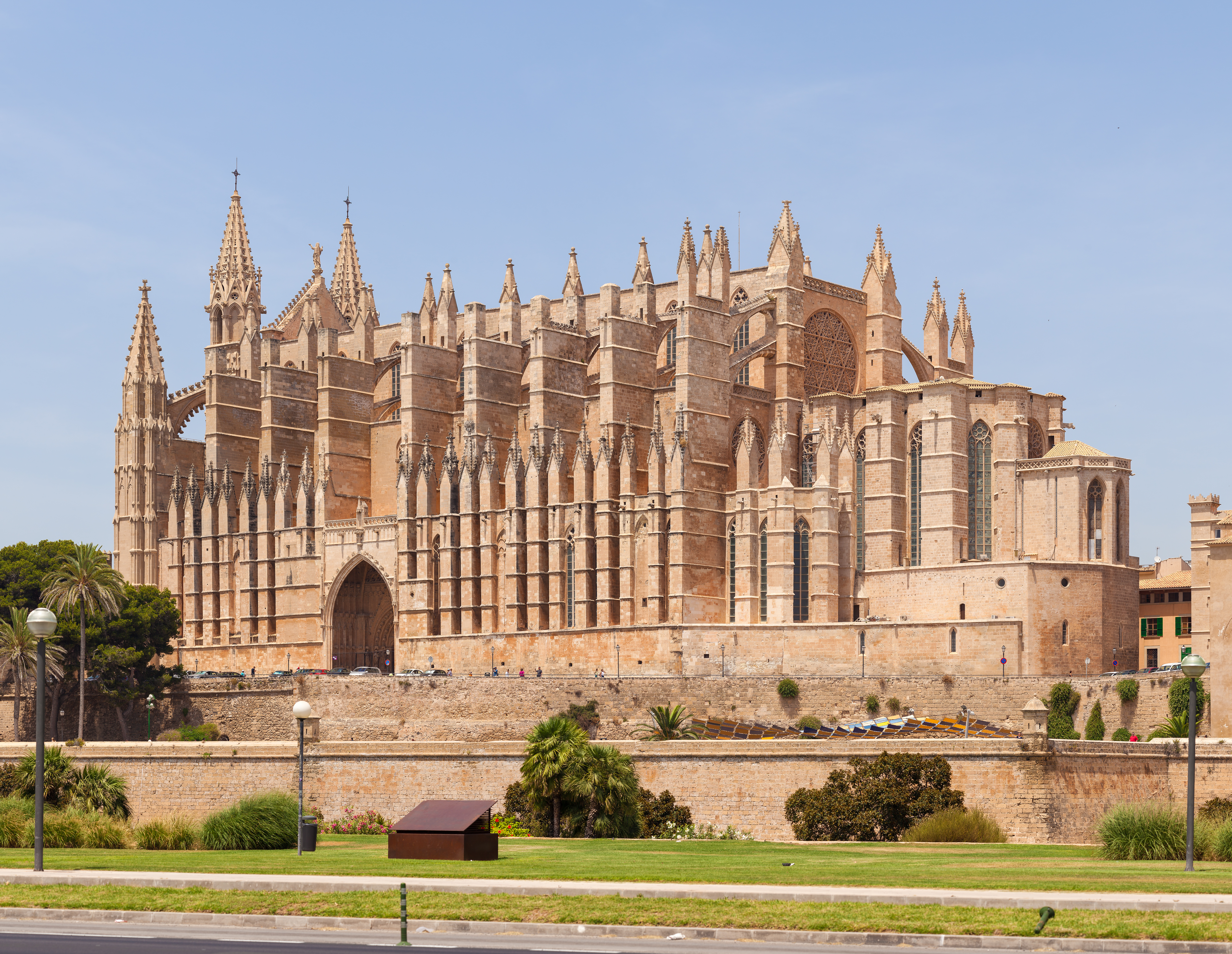
Palma Cathedral, Mallorca

On the island of Mallorca, Palma Cathedral is similarly ambitious, with a large nave supported by a complex hierarchy of buttresses. Construction began in the early 14th century, and its chevet was completed in 1327, though the cathedral was not finished until the 17th century. The choir lacks an ambulatory and is lower than the nave, which has a two-storey elevation with soaring frestas and tall windows. The high vaults are supported by slender octagonal pillars. Contemporary with the cathedral is nearby Bellver Castle, commissioned for King James II of Aragon. It has a perfectly circular plan with the residential buildings accessed from a two-storey arcade. The body of the castle connects externally to the keep, also of circular plan.

==== Late Gothic in Spain ====
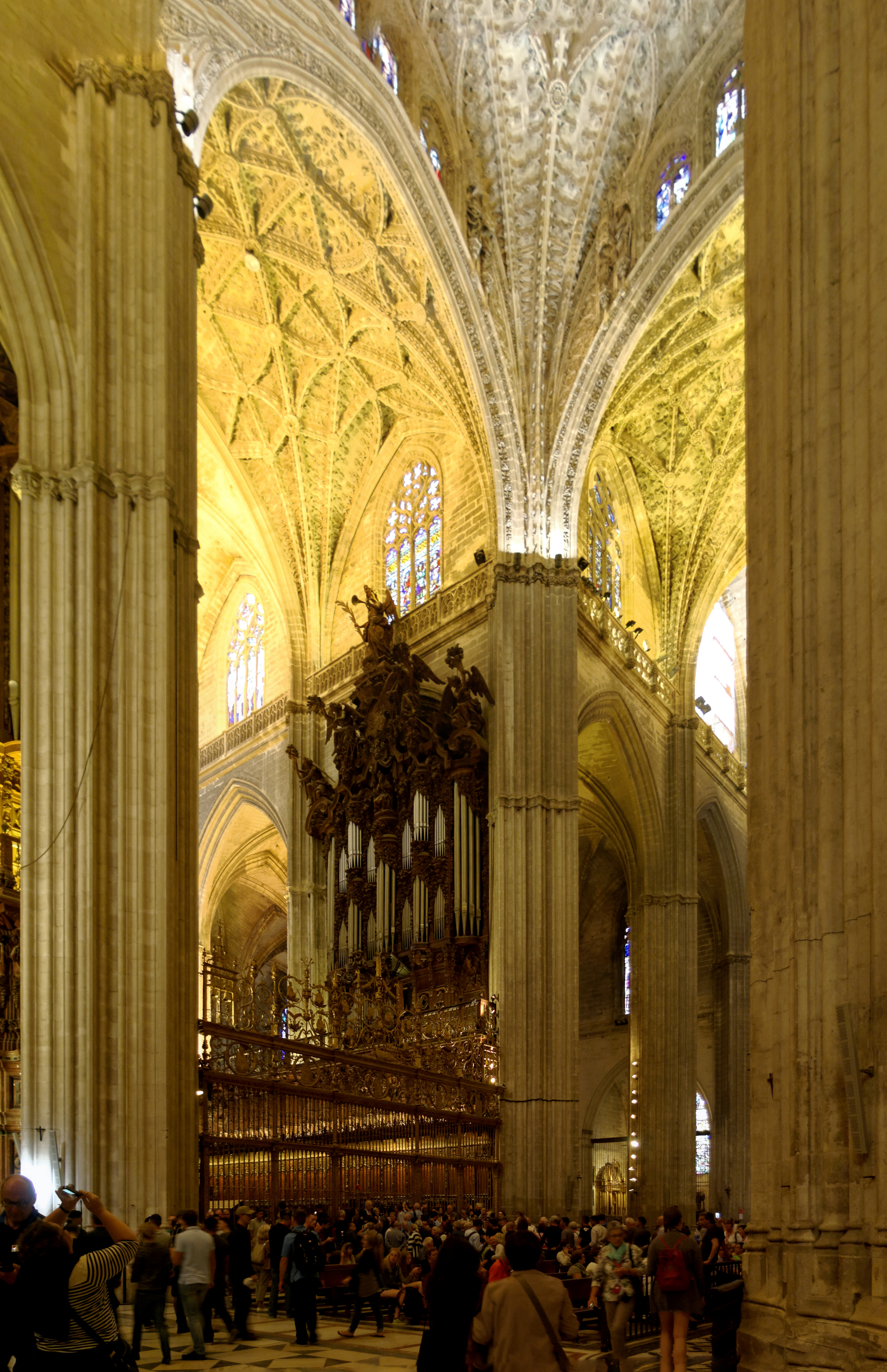
Seville Cathedral, interior (1401)

In contrast to other areas of Europe, cathedral building in Spain continued extensively into the later Middle Ages and beyond the end of the Gothic period, owing to the drawn-out Reconquista. The largest church of this period is Seville Cathedral (1401), designed with a five-aisled plan and chapels embedded directly into the exterior buttresses. The vaults rise to the level of the upper clerestory windows.

In 1469, the country achieved political unification as a result of the marriage between Ferdinand of Aragon and Isabella of Castile; in 1492, this was followed by the annexation of the Kingdom of Granada, until then the last Muslim domain, and in 1512 the Kingdom of Navarre was conquered, cementing Spain's place as a dominant European power. In the late 15th century, a new style called Isabelline thus spread, fusing the characteristics of Flamboyant Gothic with Mudéjar elements and early Renaissance influxes.

One example is the church of San Gil Abad in Burgos, where the Chapel of the Nativity of Mary (1529) uses squinches to convert the square plan into an octagonal one, crowned by a star vault with a central oculus, while the Chapel of the Three Kings (1489) is characterized by its geometric complexity and highly ornamented vault bosses, reflecting the direct influence of Burgos Cathedral.

Spanish Gothic from this phase resulted from close collaboration between local, German, Flemish, and French architects and artisans. Among the most prominent figures is Juan Guas, designer of the elaborate Franciscan San Juan de los Reyes in Toledo. The church, commissioned by the Catholic Monarchs, was intended to house the royal pantheon until the conquest of Granada (1492). Meanwhile Simón de Colonia designed the octagonal Constable's Chapel (1482–1494) in Burgos Cathedral, crowned by complex spires and flamboyant tracery. The same architect later worked on the exuberant façade of the church of Saint Paul in Valladolid (1495–1505).

=== Portugal ===
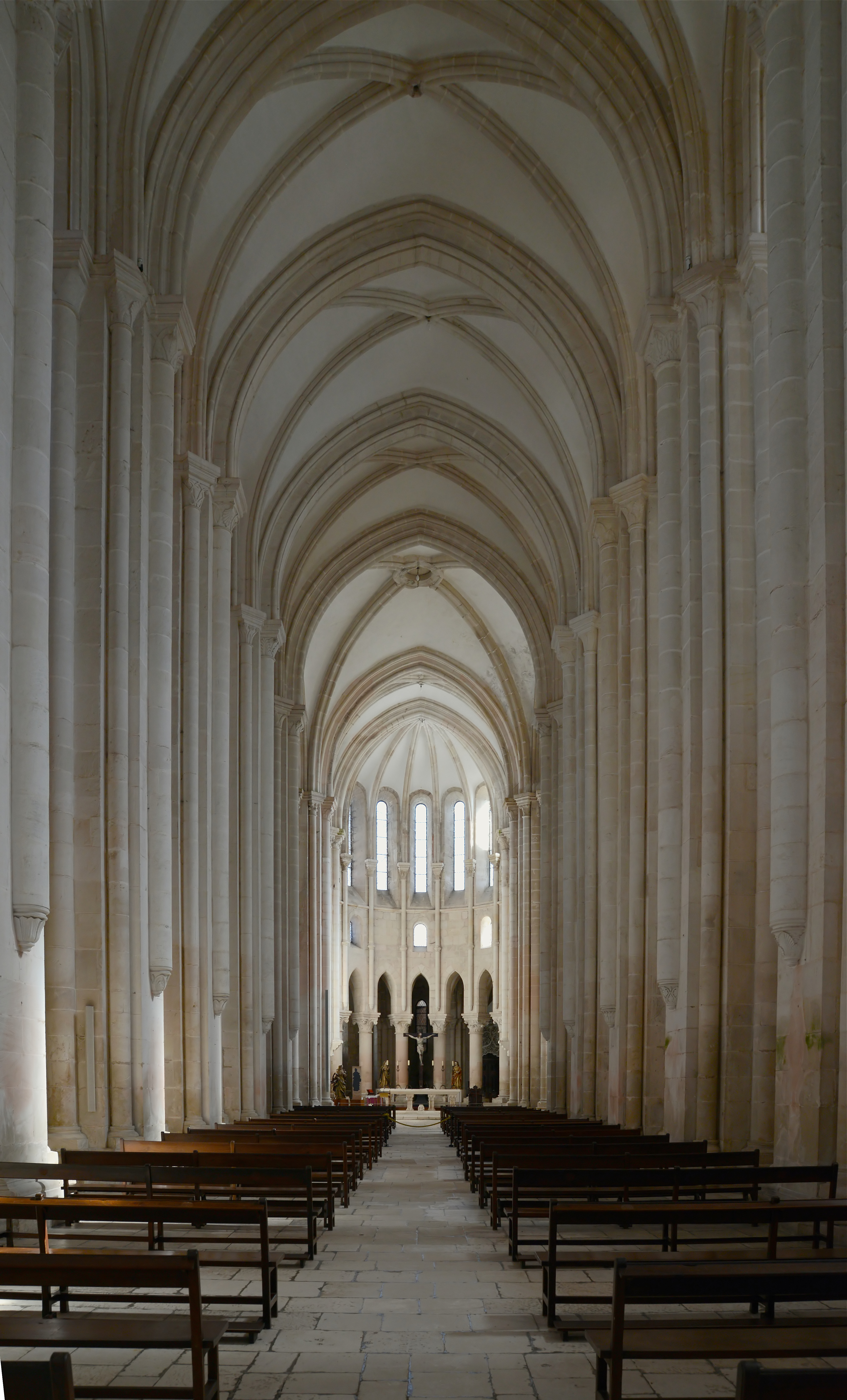
Early Gothic interior at Alcobaça, looking east

In contrast to the scale and monumentality of northern European cathedrals, Portuguese Gothic is characterized by restrained volumes, conditioned by local materials. As in Spain, Gothic exteriors were frequently blocky and fortress-like, lacking spires or steep roofs. The first to introduce the style were the 12th century Cistercian monks, in the Alcobaça Monastery (1178-1252), the country's first entirely Gothic building. It has a chevet, rib vaults and flying buttresses. Simultaneously, military orders played a decisive role in spreading the new architecture, as in the Church of Santa Maria do Olival and the round church in the Convent of Christ, both in Tomar (Templars). Évora Cathedral and the cloister of the Old Cathedral of Coimbra also belong to this initial phase. The spread of Gothic architecture was enabled by contacts with the western French coastline and dynastic relations with the House of Évreux, introducing models that linked Portugal and the Asturias to southwestern France. However, the transition between Romanesque and Gothic proceeded slowly, throughout the 13th and 14th centuries. Conservative features like plate tracery were used as late as the 14th century, for example at the Monastery of Odivelas (1295–1305). Santarém was the centre of this transitional style.

Cathedrals initiated in the Romanesque period, such as Porto and Lisbon, were completed or remodelled according to Gothic principles, frequently incorporating cloisters of Cistercian influence. Porto also has early flying buttresses. Only the Alcobaça Monastery, the Monastery of Santa Clara-a-Velha, Évora Cathedral, Guarda Cathedral and the Batalha Monastery are fully stone vaulted, with timber ceilings being more common in mendicant churches.

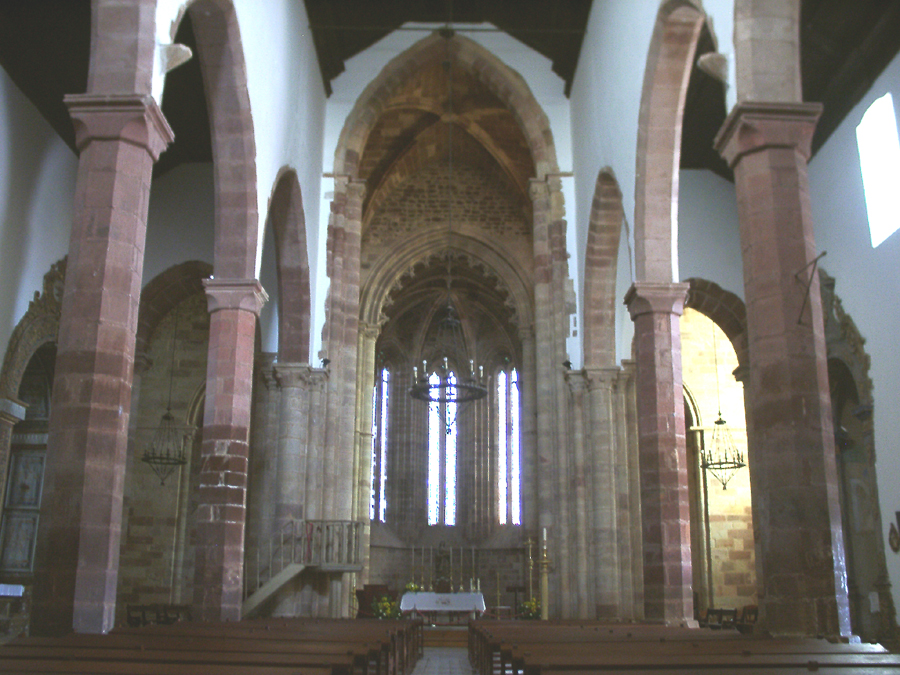
Unvaulted nave and vaulted apses at Silves Cathedral

The full consolidation of the Gothic in the 14th century was driven by the establishment of mendicant friars in growing urban centres. Churches built or influenced by the friars were simple and austere, with unvaulted three-aisled plans, clerestory lighting over arcades, and projecting transepts with stone-vaulted apse chapels. Exemplifying this typology are Silves Cathedral and the convent of São Francisco of Porto. In nunnery churches, the nave was frequently divided into two sections, reserving the western sector for the nuns and the eastern one for the congregation, a layout that required the elimination of the western portal in favour of southern doors.

Batalha Monastery, the Unfinished Chapels (15th century)

During the 14th century, the pace of construction reduced, being revitalised under João I (1385–1433), a phase termed Joanine Gothic. The primary monument of this period is Batalha Monastery (begun in 1387), the burial-place of the Aviz dynasty. The structure is eclectic, mixing Flamboyant Gothic features with a Perpendicular-influenced façade. The Founder's Chapel was added in 1434, followed by an octagonal funerary rotunda (the Unifinished Chapels) under King Duarte. The Batalha worksite was the centre of 15th- and 16th-century Portuguese architecture, gathering artists from across the kingdom. Its influence spread through masters trained at Batalha, who then designed buildings like the collegiate church of Guimarães, Guarda Cathedral and the Carmo Convent in Lisbon.

Manueline window at the Tomar chapter house

Manuel I (1495–1521) pushed the completion of the rotunda at Batalha, adding seven radial chapels and a monumental portal sculpted by Mateus Fernandes. His reign saw the Manueline style, a variant of Late Gothic fuelled by economic prosperity and the cultural context of the Age of Discovery. Manueline articulated the decorative exuberance of Late Gothic with a naturalist, heraldic, and maritime iconography. The paradigmatic expression of the style is the Chapter House window of the Convent of Christ in Tomar (1510–1514), designed by Diogo de Arruda. Other important examples include the Jerónimos Monastery and the Belém Tower in Lisbon. As well as the Manueline style, late Gothic architecture in Portugal included Mudéjar elements, as at Sintra Royal Palace.

== Characteristics ==
=== Arches ===
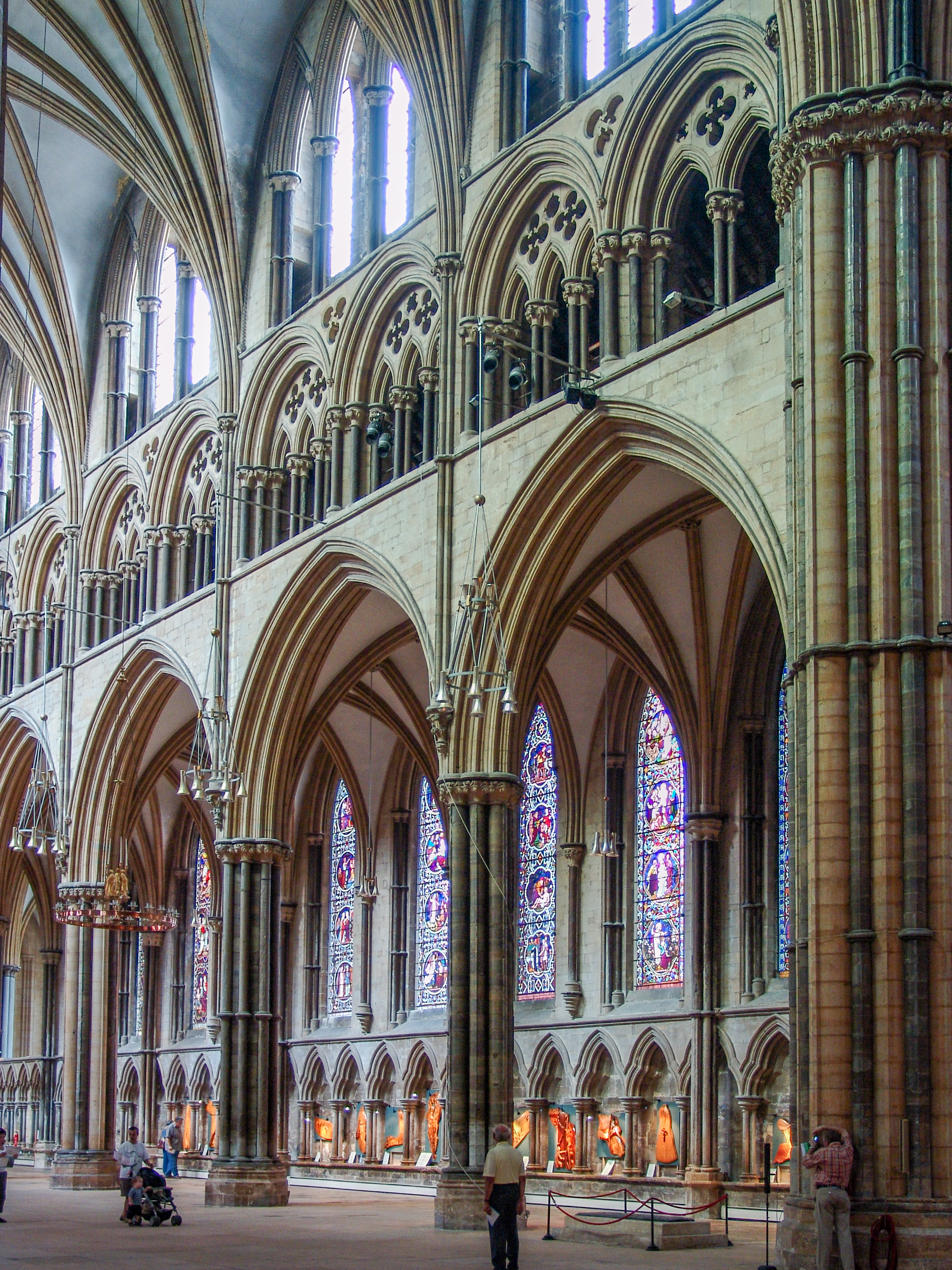
Pointed arches in the nave of Lincoln Cathedral (13th century).

The defining characteristic of the Gothic style is the pointed arch, which was widely used in both structure and decoration, giving a sensation of verticality. Pointed arches were commonly used for the arcades, windows, doorways and vaults. They were also used to solve geometrical problems, such as to bring transverse and diagonal arches in vaults to the same height, as in the 12th century nave of Durham Cathedral.

The earliest Gothic pointed arches were lancet lights or lancet windows, which are narrow windows terminating in a lancet arch. A lancet arch has a radius greater than its breadth and resembles the blade of a lancet.

The Flamboyant style used lavish arches such as the arc-en-accolade, where a pointed arch over a doorway was topped by a pointed sculptural ornament called a fleuron with pinnacles on either side. The arches of the doorway were further decorated with crockets.

=== Vaults ===
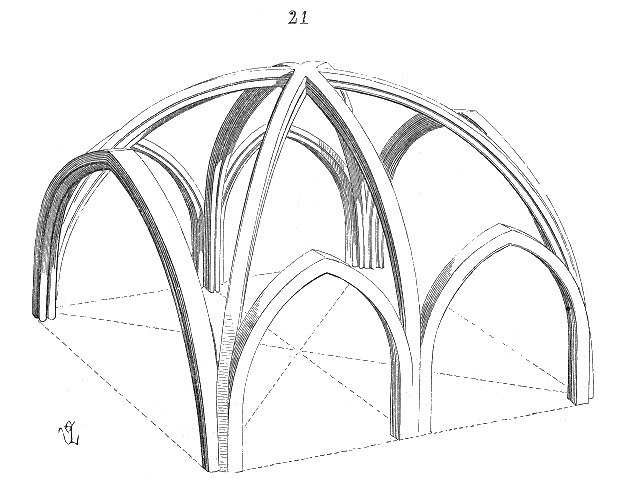
Structure of an early sexpartite Gothic rib vault. (drawing by Eugène Viollet-le-Duc)

The Gothic rib vault was one of the essential elements that made the great height and large windows of Gothic architecture possible. Unlike barrel vaults, where the weight was evenly distributed along the walls, requiring thick walls and small windows, the Gothic rib vault directed the thrust to the corners of the bay, and then downwards to the pillars and columns below. The space between the ribs was filled with thin panels of small pieces of stone, which were much lighter than earlier groin vaults. The outward thrust against the walls was countered by the weight of buttresses and later flying buttresses. As a result, the walls no longer had a structural role in supporting the vault, and could be made thinner and freely pierced with large windows. Nevertheless, simple barrel vaults were still occasionally used throughout the Gothic period, particularly in military architecture, where thick walls and small windows were a necessity.

The earlier Gothic rib vaults, used at Sens Cathedral (begun between 1135 and 1140) and Notre-Dame de Paris (begun 1163), were divided by the ribs into six compartments (sexpartite). Since each vault covered two bays, they needed support from alternating columns and piers. In later construction, the design was simplified, and the rib vaults were divided into only four compartments (quadripartite). The alternating columns and piers were replaced by simple pillars, each receiving the same weight. This method was used at Chartres Cathedral (1194–1220), Amiens Cathedral (begun 1220), and Reims Cathedral. The four-part vaults made it possible for taller buildings to be constructed. Notre-Dame, with sexpartite vaults, reached a height of 35 m (115 ft), while Amiens Cathedral, which used quadripartite vaults, rose to 42.3 m (139 ft).

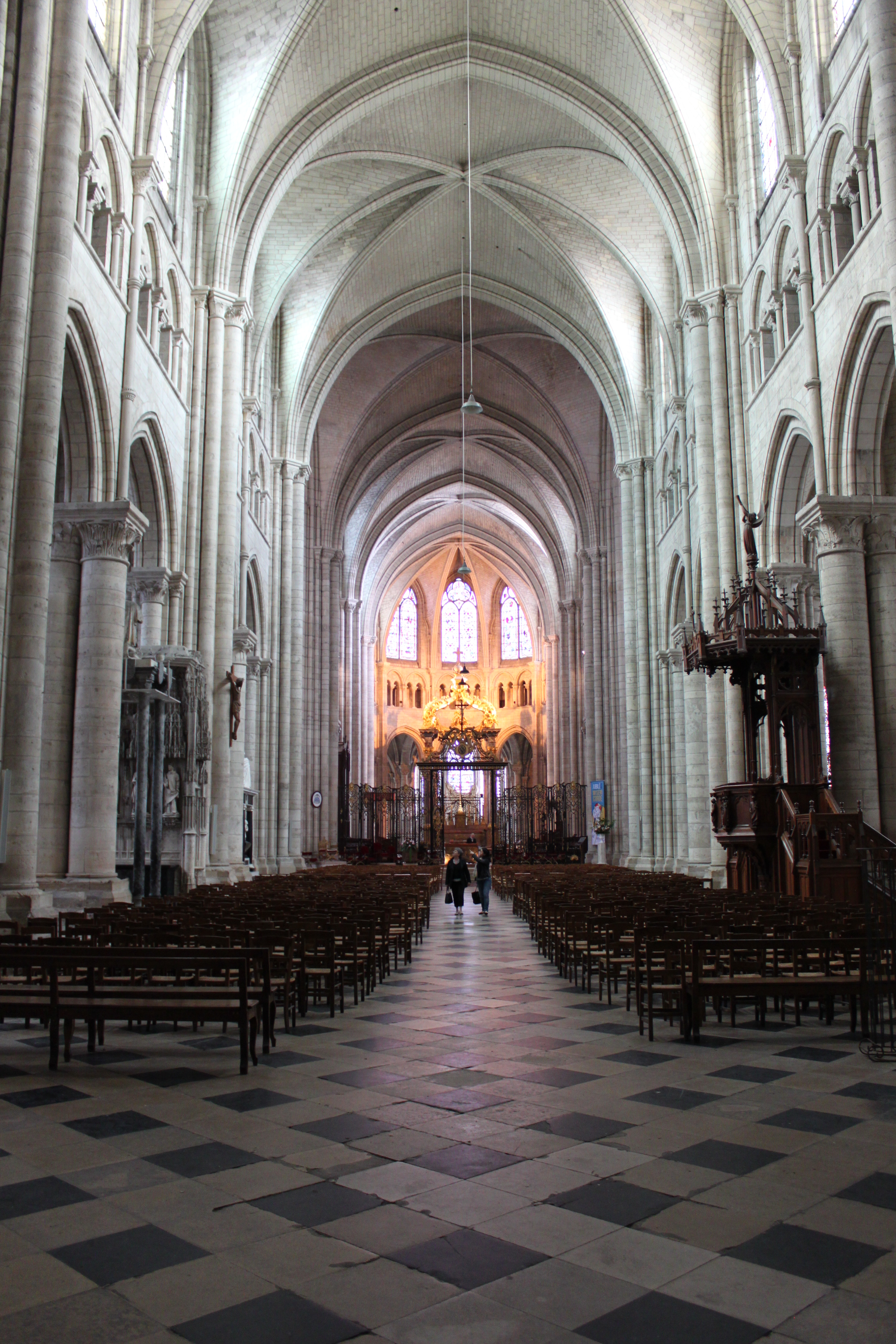
Sexpartite vaults in Sens Cathedral (1135–1164)

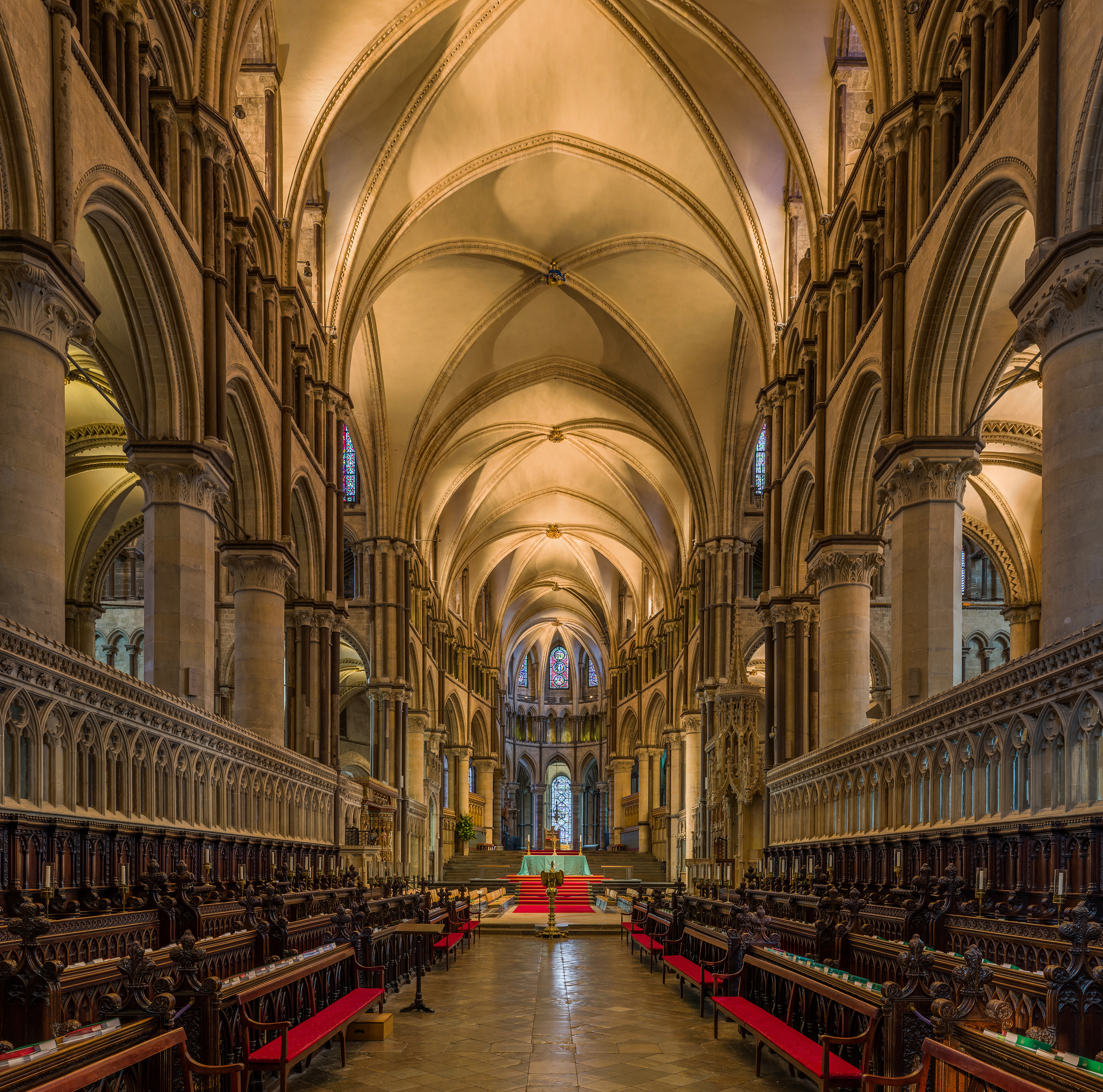
Sexpartite vaults in Canterbury Cathedral (1174–77)

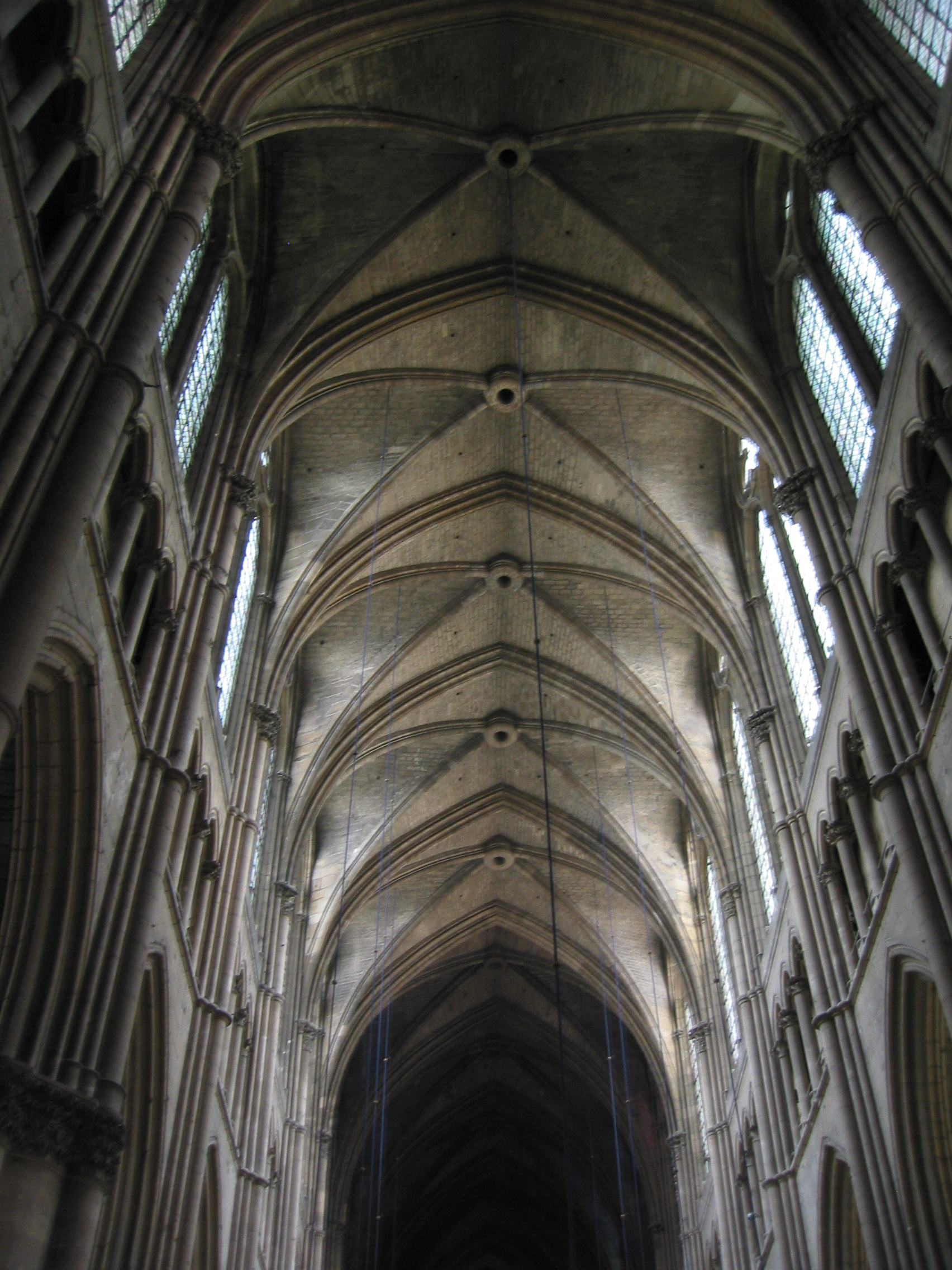
Quadripartite vaults in Reims Cathedral (1211–1275)

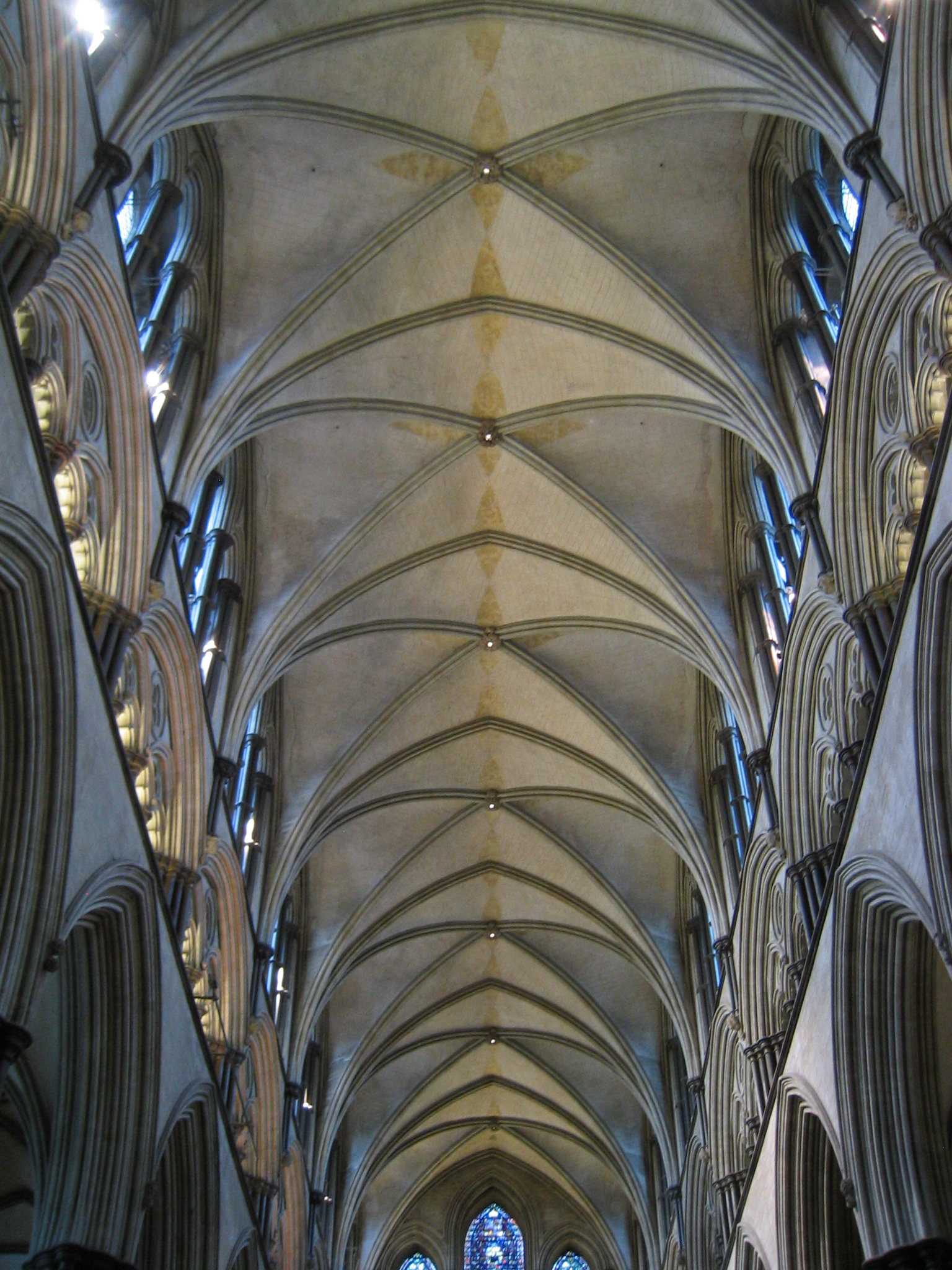
Quadripartite vaults in Salisbury Cathedral (1220–1258)

==== Later Gothic vaults ====
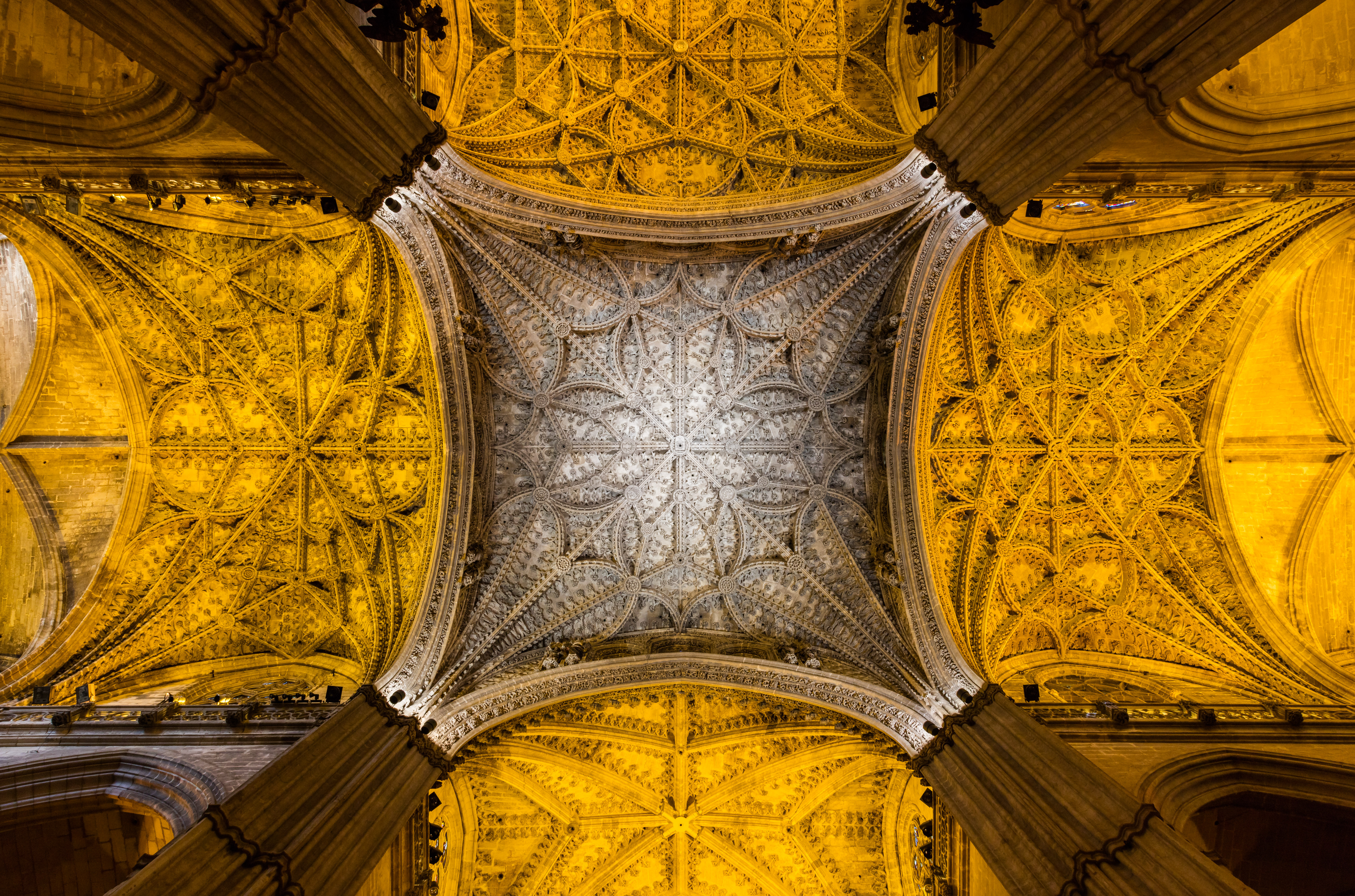
Lierne vault in Seville Cathedral crossing

In France, the four-part rib vault was used almost exclusively until the end of the Gothic period. However, in England, several imaginative new vaults were invented which had more elaborate decorative features. They became a signature of the later English Gothic styles.

The first of these new vaults had an additional ridge rib along the apex of the vault. This was popular in England, as it obscured the jagged meeting of the webbing stones at the ridge that characterised English vault construction. It first appeared in the vaults of the choir of Lincoln Cathedral (1190s), then at Worcester Cathedral choir (1224), and then in the south transept of Lichfield Cathedral. The use of the ridge rib enabled the development of tierceron vaults, again at Lincoln, in which additional ribs ran from the springing to the ridge rib, creating a palm tree-like effect.

The 14th century brought the invention of several new types of vaults which were more and more decorative. These vaults often copied the forms of the elaborate tracery of the Late Gothic styles. These included the lierne vault, where a group of additional ribs between the principal ribs forms a star design. The oldest vaults of this kind are the crypt of St Stephen's Chapel at Westminster Palace, built about 1290, though there may be earlier Frencch examples. A second type was the net or reticulated vault, where the ribs were applied over a barrel vault, with the transverse openings not reaching the height of the central ridge. This type was common in western England, as at Tewkesbury Abbey (nave) and Gloucester Cathedral (choir and transepts). They were first used in the choir of Bristol Cathedral in about 1311.This form was later adopted in central Europe, as at Prague Cathedral.

Another late Gothic form, the fan vault, with ribs spreading upwards and outwards, appeared later in the 14th century. The oldest surviving example is the cloister of Gloucester Cathedral (c. 1370). It is associated with Perpendicular Gothic, with the largest example being at King's College Chapel, Cambridge (vaulted 1512-15). From the lierne and fan vault developed the pendant vault, in which large stone pendants were suspended from a concealed structure behind the vault. Notable examples include the Divinity School, Oxford (lierne) and Henry VII's Chapel, Westminster Abbey (fan).

Another new form was the skeleton vault, which appeared in the English Decorated style. It has an additional network of ribs, which cross the vault but are only directly attached to it at certain points. It appeared in a chapel of Lincoln Cathedral in 1300. and then several other English churches, especially Bristol Cathedral. This style of vault was adopted in the 14th century by German architects, particularly Peter Parler, as at the south porch of Prague Cathedral.

Elaborate vaults also appeared in civic architecture. An example is the ceiling of the Vladislav Hall in Prague Castle in Bohemia designed by Benedikt Ried in 1493. The ribs twist and intertwine in fantasy patterns, which John Harvey termed "Rococo Gothic".

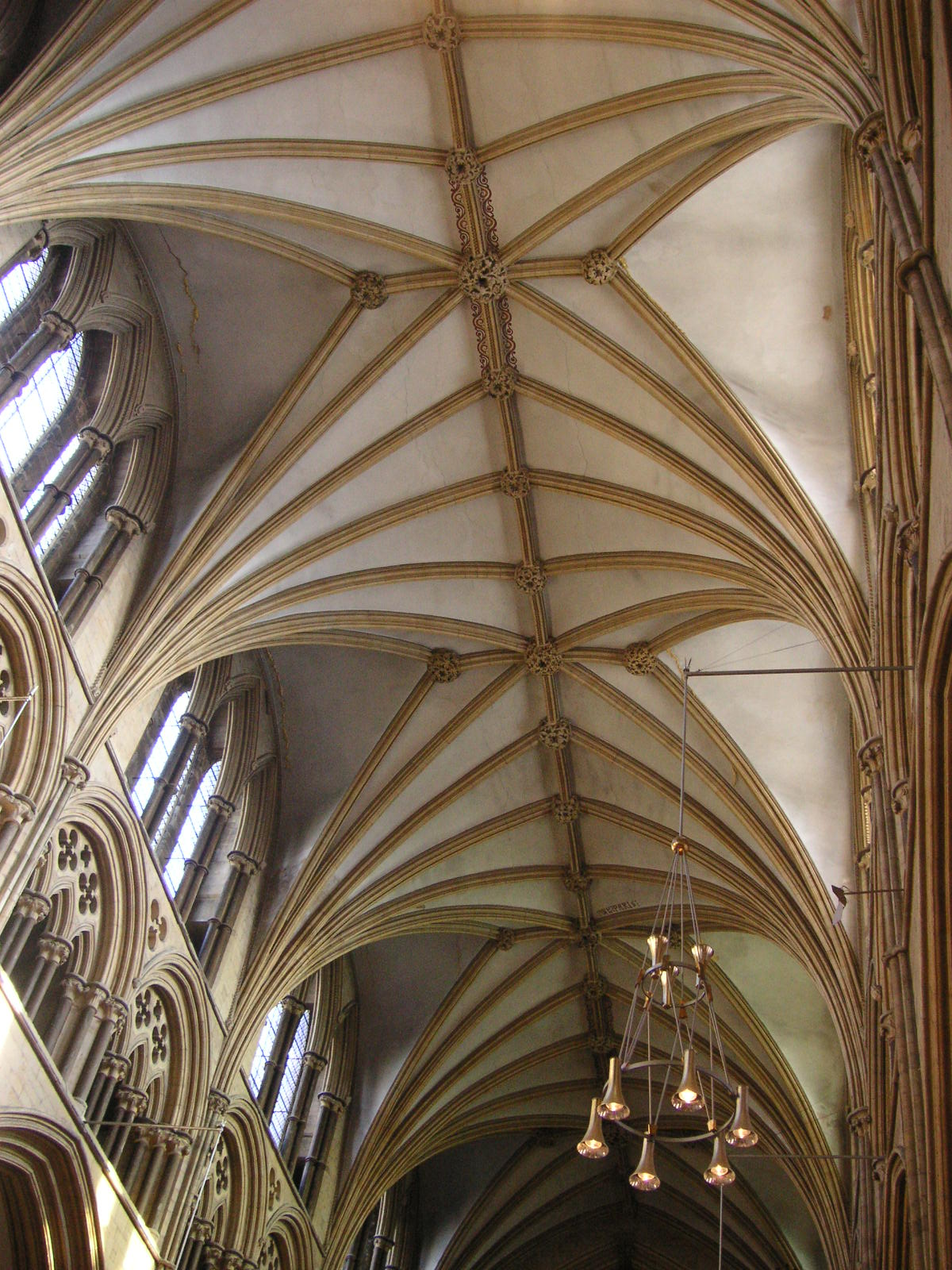
Lincoln Cathedral nave, tierceron vault

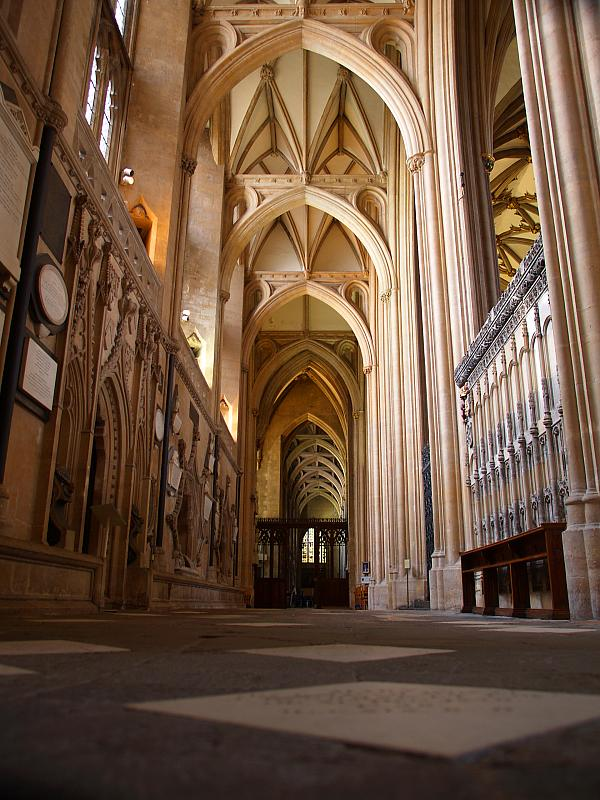
Skeleton vault in choir aisle of Bristol Cathedral (c. 1311–1340)

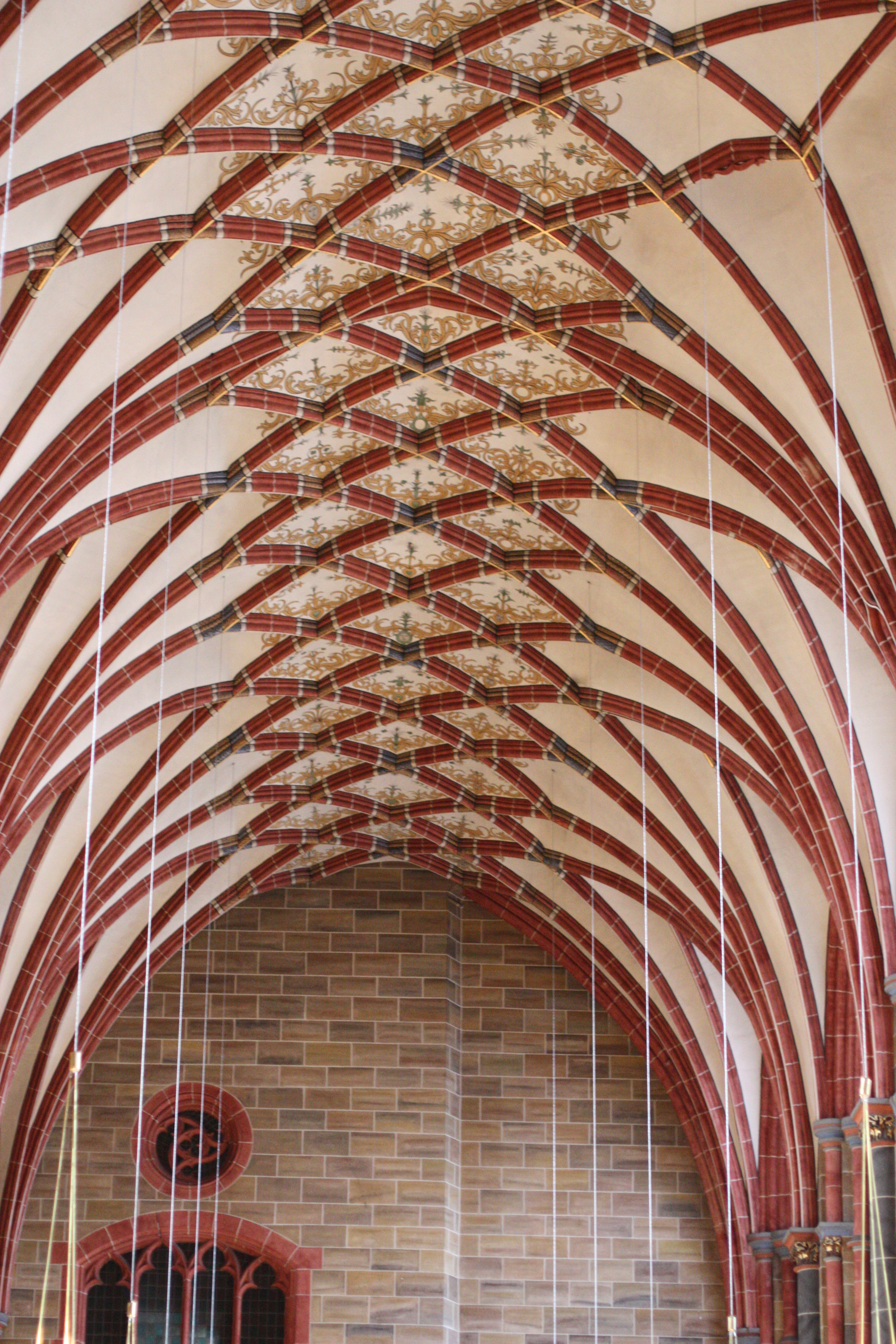
Bremen Cathedral, Germany – north aisle, a reticular (net) vault with intersecting ribs

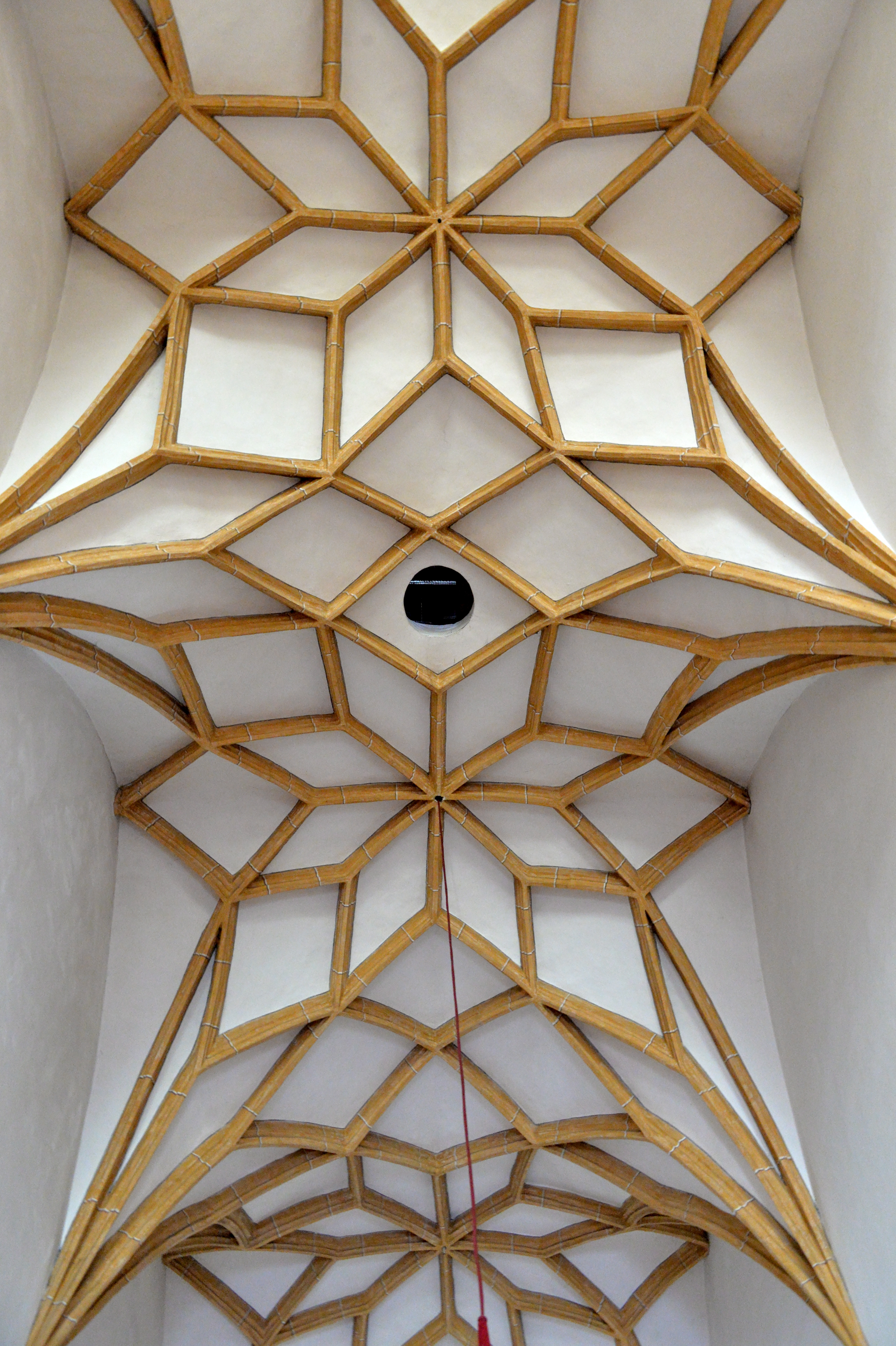
Church of the Assumption, St Marein, Austria – star vault with intersecting lierne ribs

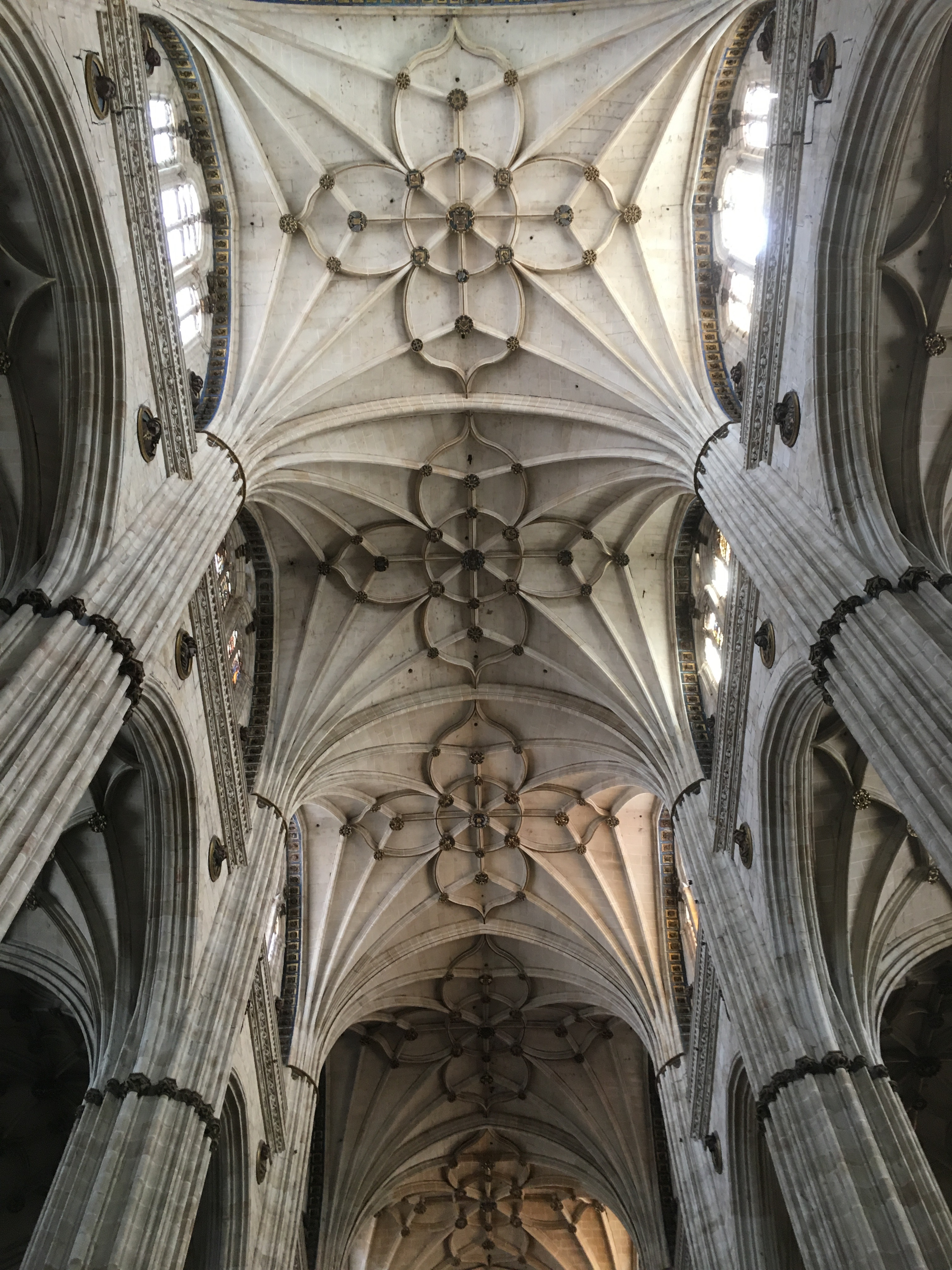
Salamanca Cathedral, Spain - Flamboyant lierne patterns. (16th–18th century)

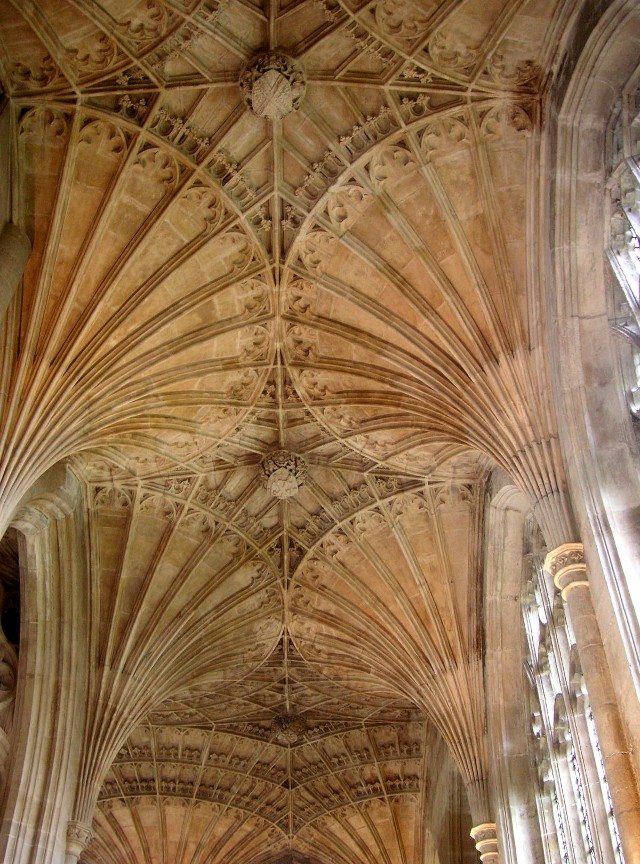
Peterborough Cathedral, retrochoir – intersecting fan vaults

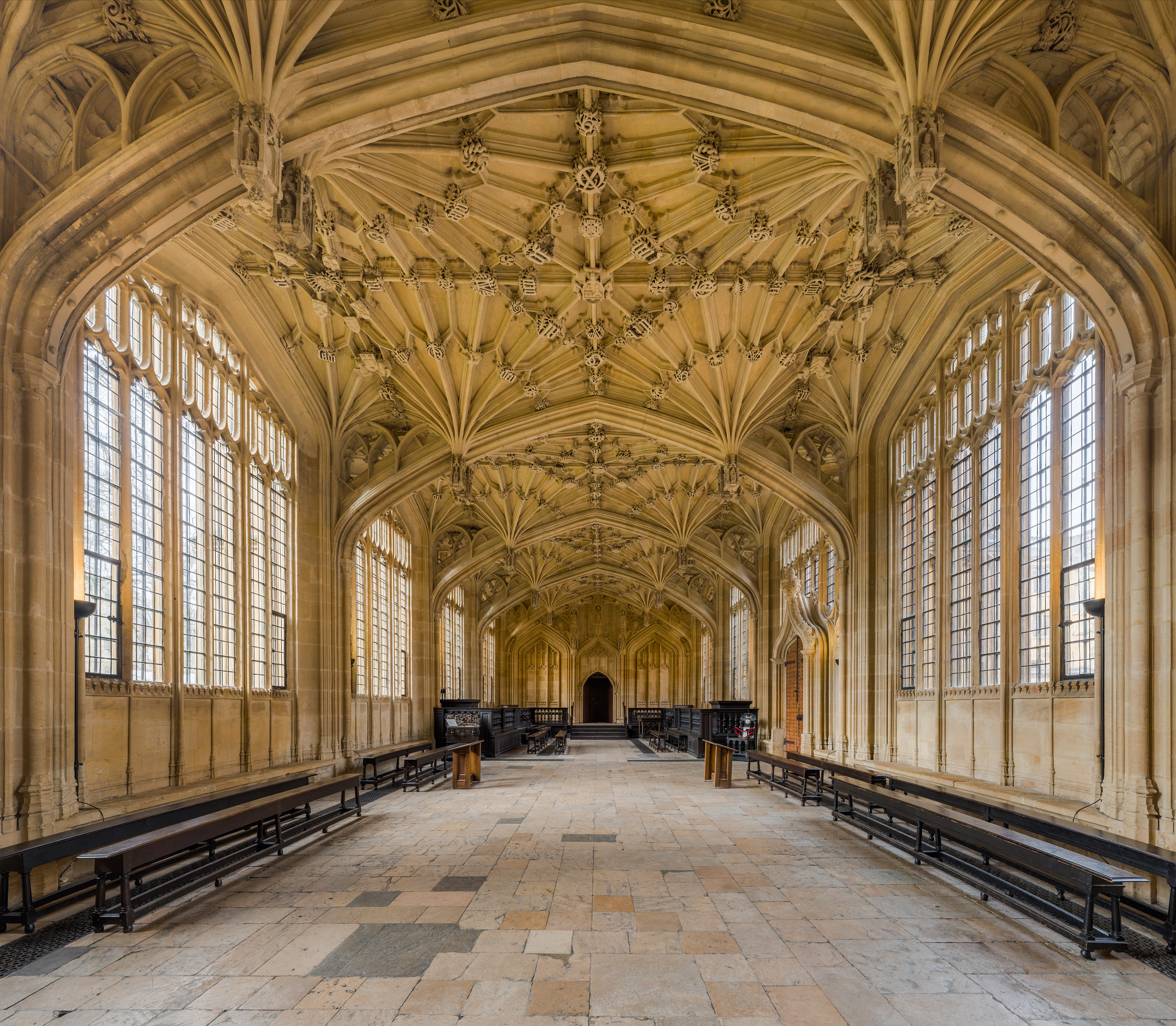
Divinity School, Oxford - pendant lierne vaults

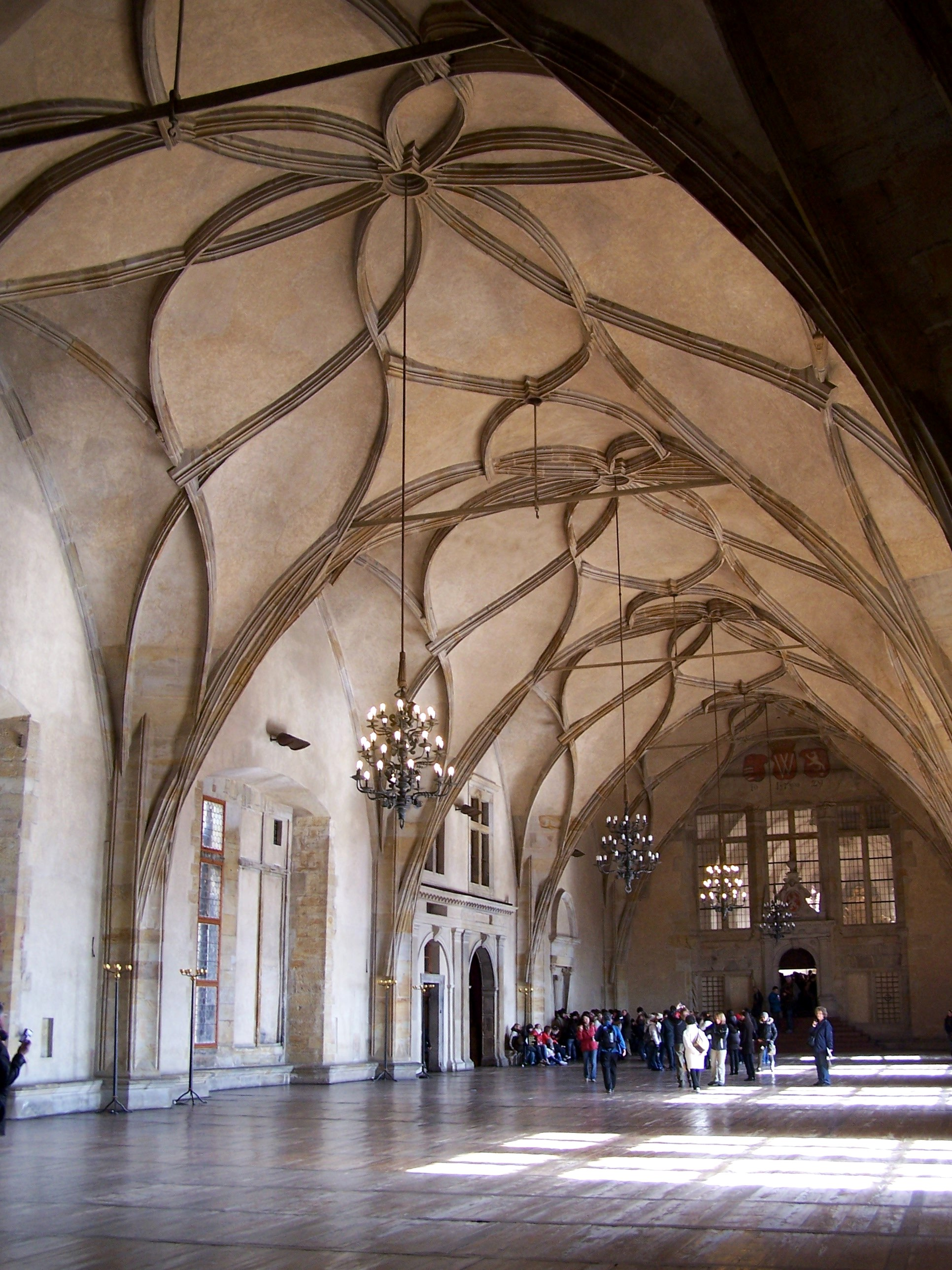
"Rococo Gothic" vaults of Vladislav Hall of Prague Castle (1493)

=== Buttresses ===
An important feature of Gothic architecture was the flying buttress, a half-arch outside the building which carried the thrust of weight of the roof or vaults inside over a roof or an aisle to a heavy stone column. The buttresses were placed in rows on either side of the building, and were often topped by heavy stone pinnacles, both to give extra weight and for additional decoration.

Buttresses had existed since Roman times, usually set directly against the building, but the Gothic vaults were more sophisticated. In later structures, the buttresses often had several arches, each reaching in to a different level of the structure. The buttresses permitted the buildings to be both taller, and to have thinner walls, with greater space for windows.

Over time, the buttresses and pinnacles became more elaborate supporting statues and other decoration, as at Beauvais Cathedral and Reims Cathedral. The arches had an additional practical purpose; they contained lead channels which carried rainwater off the roof; it was expelled from the mouths of stone gargoyles placed in rows on the buttresses.

Flying buttresses were used less frequently in England, where the emphasis was more on length than height. One example of English buttresses was Canterbury Cathedral, whose choir and buttresses were rebuilt in Gothic style by William of Sens and William the Englishman. However, they were very popular in Germany: in Cologne Cathedral the buttresses were lavishly decorated with statuary and other ornament, and were a prominent feature of the exterior.

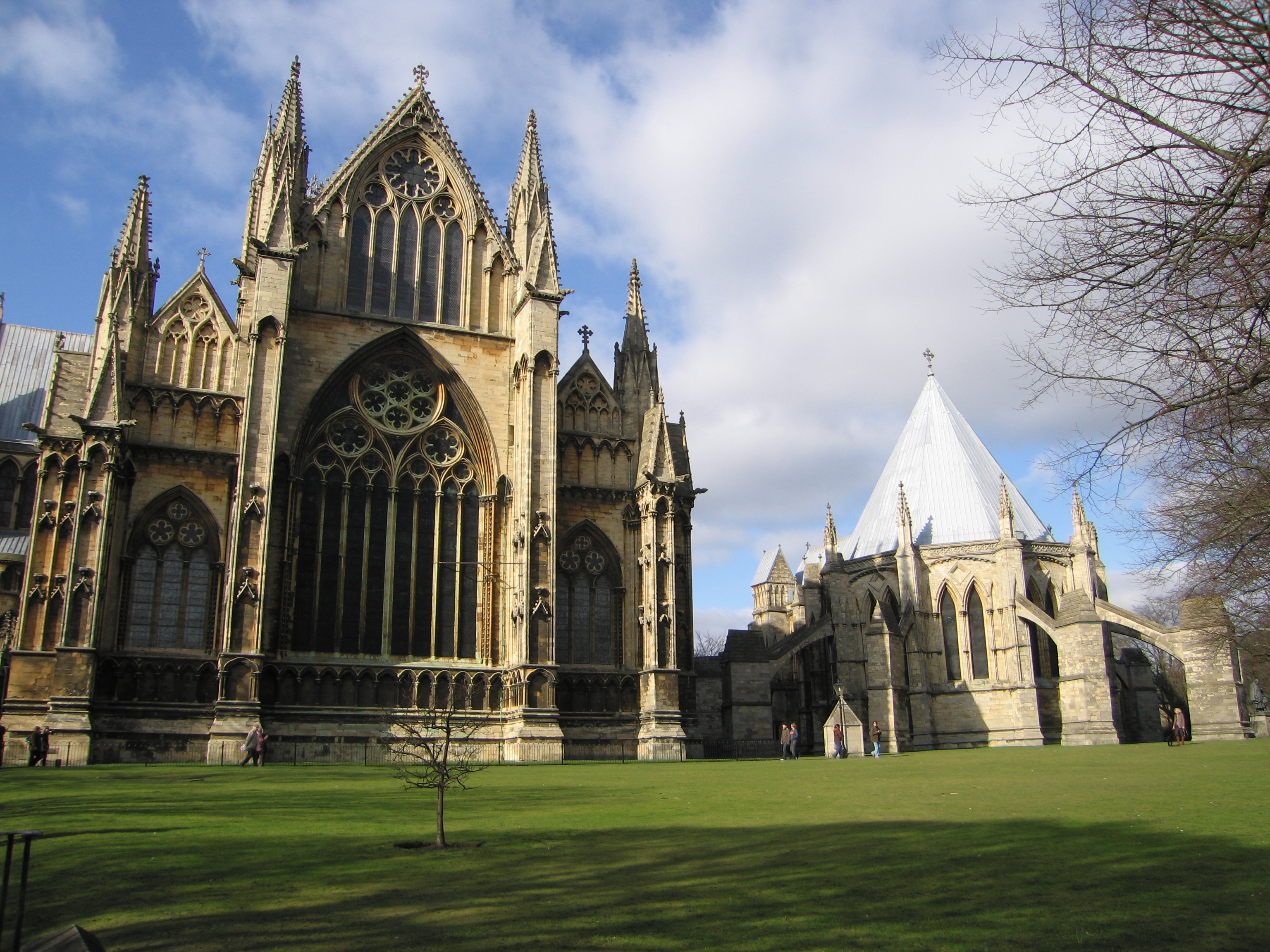
East end of Lincoln Cathedral, with wall buttress, and chapter house with flying buttresses. (1185–1311)

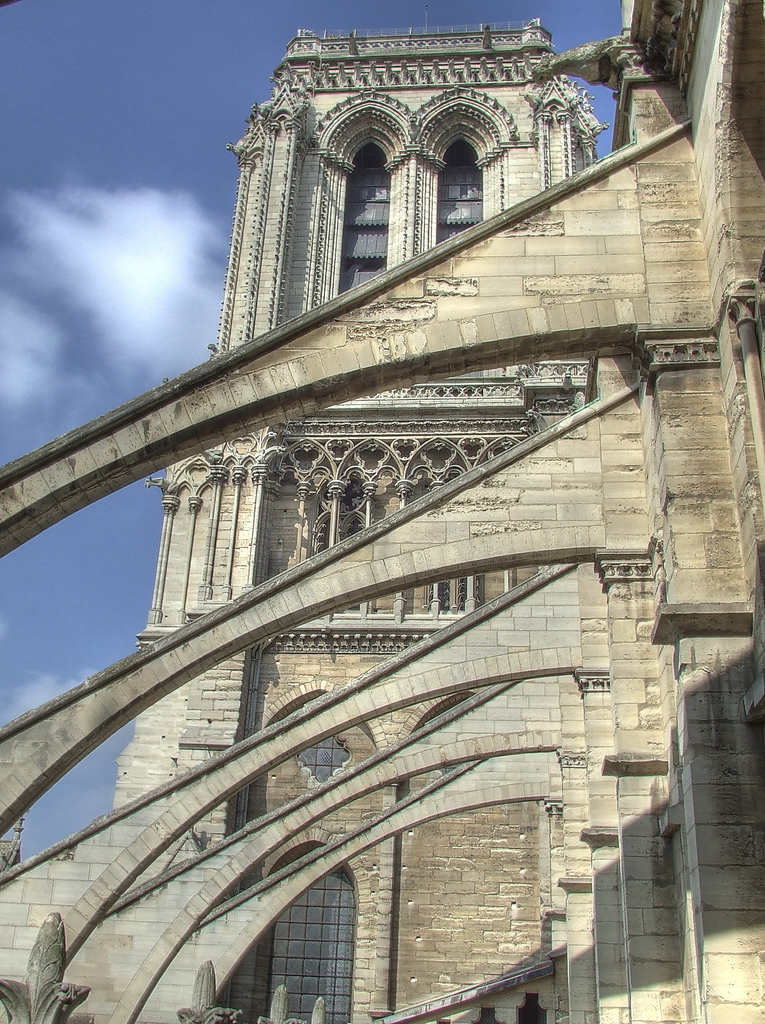
Flying buttresses of Notre Dame de Paris (c. 1230)

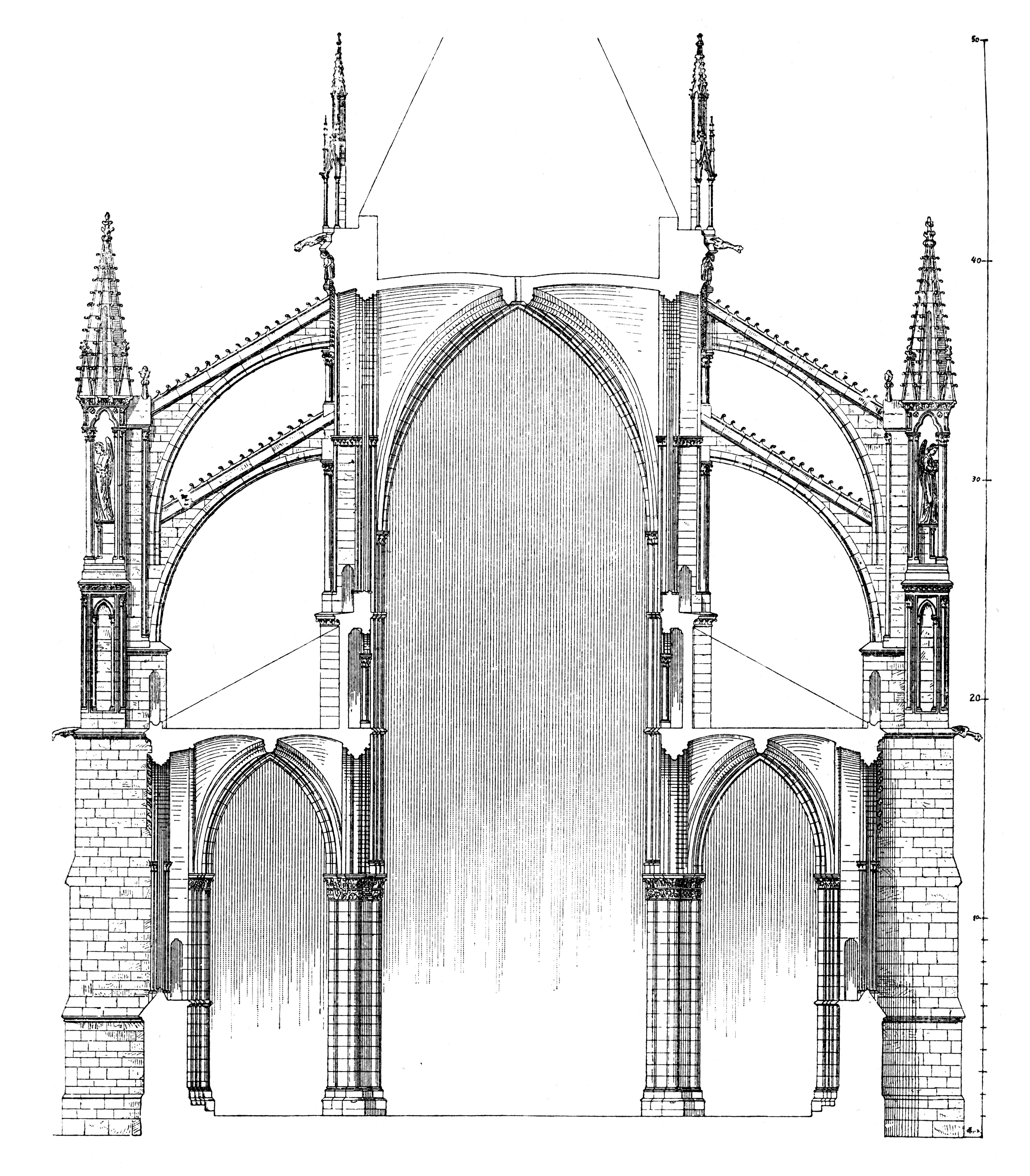
Section of Reims Cathedral showing the three levels of each buttress (1211–1275)

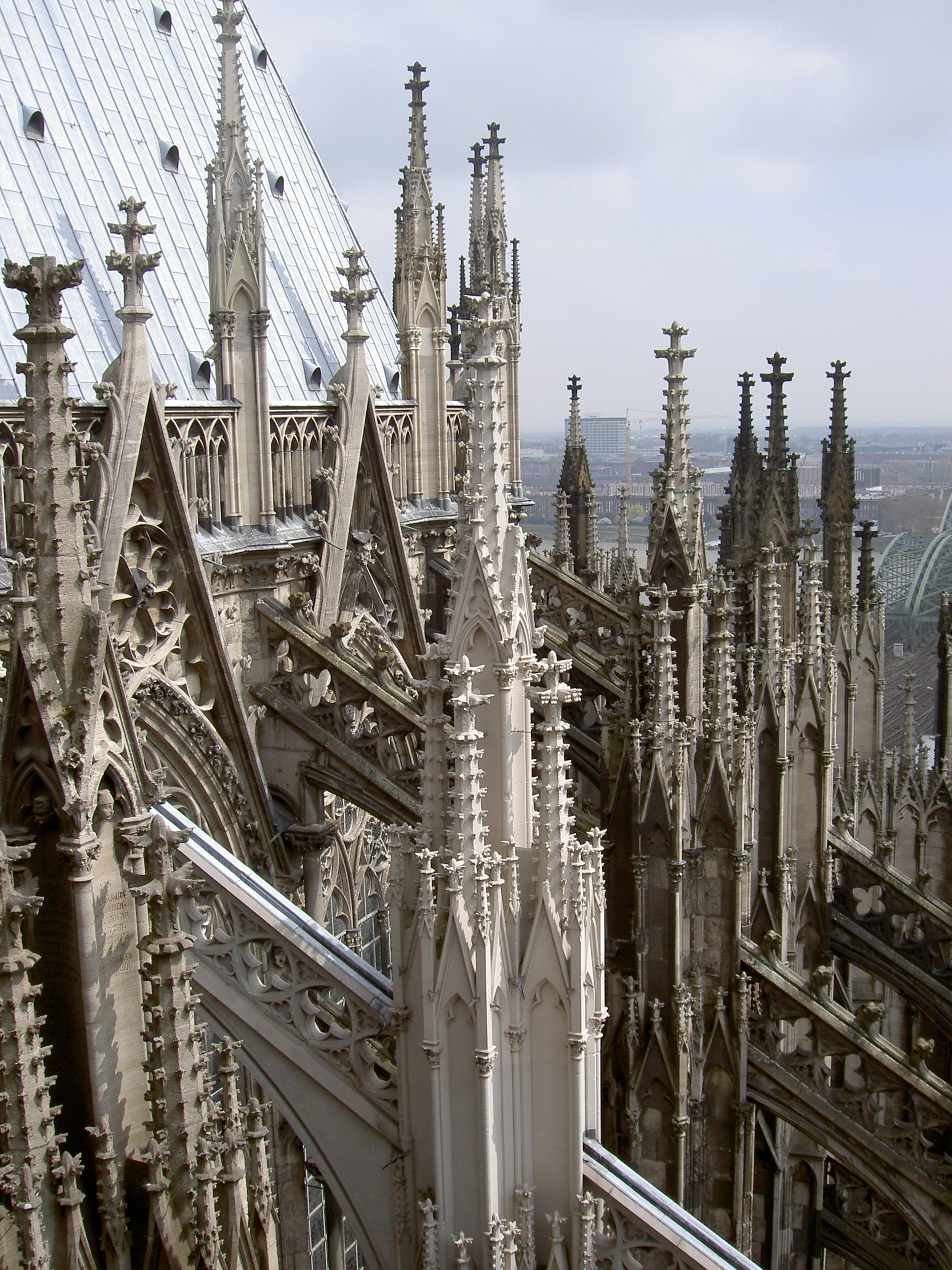
Decorated buttresses and pinnacles of Cologne Cathedral (1248–1573)

=== Towers and spires ===
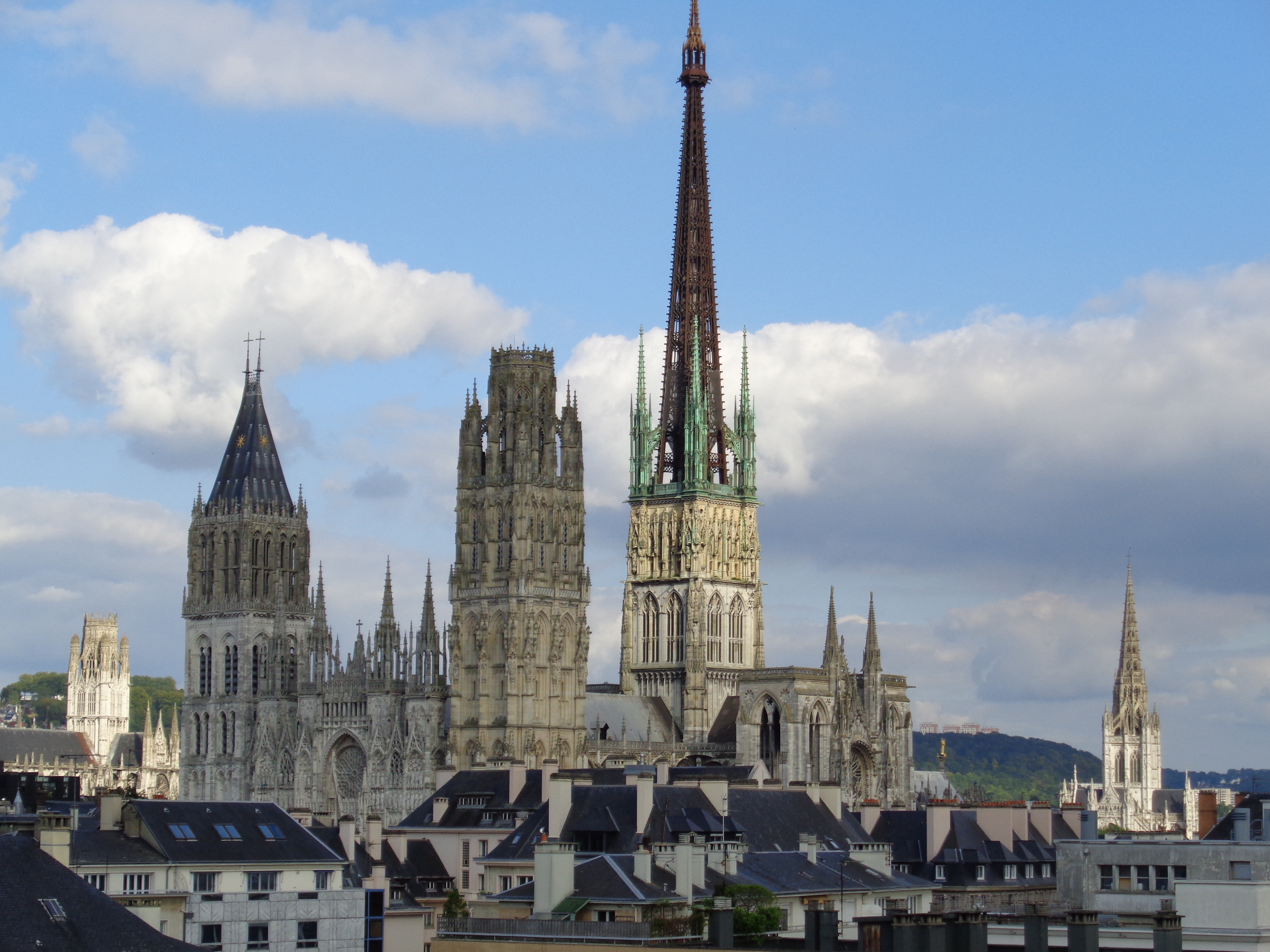
Rouen Cathedral from the south west – west towers 12th–15th century, crossing tower 15th century, spire 19th century

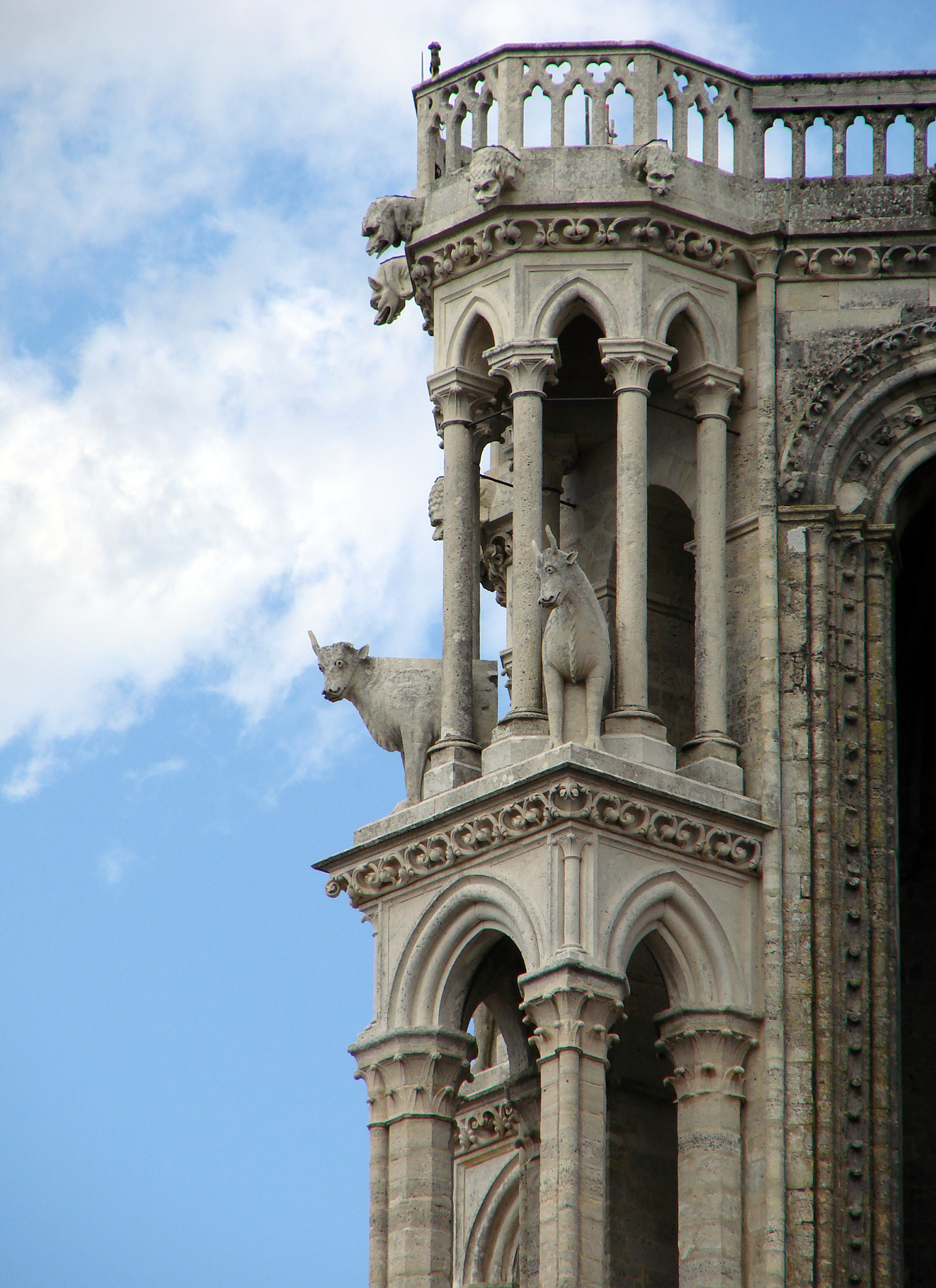
Oxen sculpture in High Gothic towers of Laon Cathedral (13th century)

Tower and spires were an important feature of Gothic churches. They presented a dramatic spectacle of great height, helped make their churches the tallest and most visible buildings in their city, and symbolised the aspirations of their builders toward heaven. They also had a practical purpose; they often served as bell towers, whose bells told the time by announcing religious services, warned of fire or enemy attack, and celebrated special occasions like military victories and coronations. Sometimes bell towers were detached from the main church, particularly in areas prone to subsidence or earthquakes, like Italy and eastern England.

The towers of cathedrals were usually the last part of the structure to be built. Many projected towers were never built, or were built in different styles to other parts of the cathedral, or with different styles on each level of the tower. At Chartres Cathedral, the south tower was built in the 12th century, in the simpler Early Gothic, while the north tower is the more highly decorated Flamboyant style. Chartres would have been even more exuberant if the second plan had been followed; it called for seven towers around the transept and sanctuary.

In the Île-de-France, cathedral towers followed the Romanesque tradition of two identical towers, one on either side of the portals. The west front of Saint-Denis became the model for the early Gothic cathedrals and High Gothic cathedrals in northern France, including Notre-Dame de Paris, Reims Cathedral, and Amiens Cathedral.

Laon Cathedral has a square lantern tower over the crossing of the transept; two towers on the western front; and two towers on the ends of the transepts. Laon's towers, with the exception of the central tower, are built with two stacked vaulted chambers pierced by lancet openings. The two western towers contain life-size stone statues of sixteen oxen in their upper arcades, said to honour the animals who hauled the stone during the cathedral's construction.

Pointed spires were often added to the towers, giving them much greater height. A variation of the spire was the flèche, a slender, spear-like spire, which was usually placed on the crossing. A flèche rises directly from the church roof, rather than from a tower, and is made of wood covered with lead. They sometimes had open frames, and were decorated with sculpture. Amiens Cathedral has a surviving 16th century flèche, which was formerly gilded. The most famous example was that of Notre-Dame de Paris. The original flèche of Notre-Dame was built on the crossing of the transept in the middle of the 13th century, and housed five bells, but was removed in 1786.

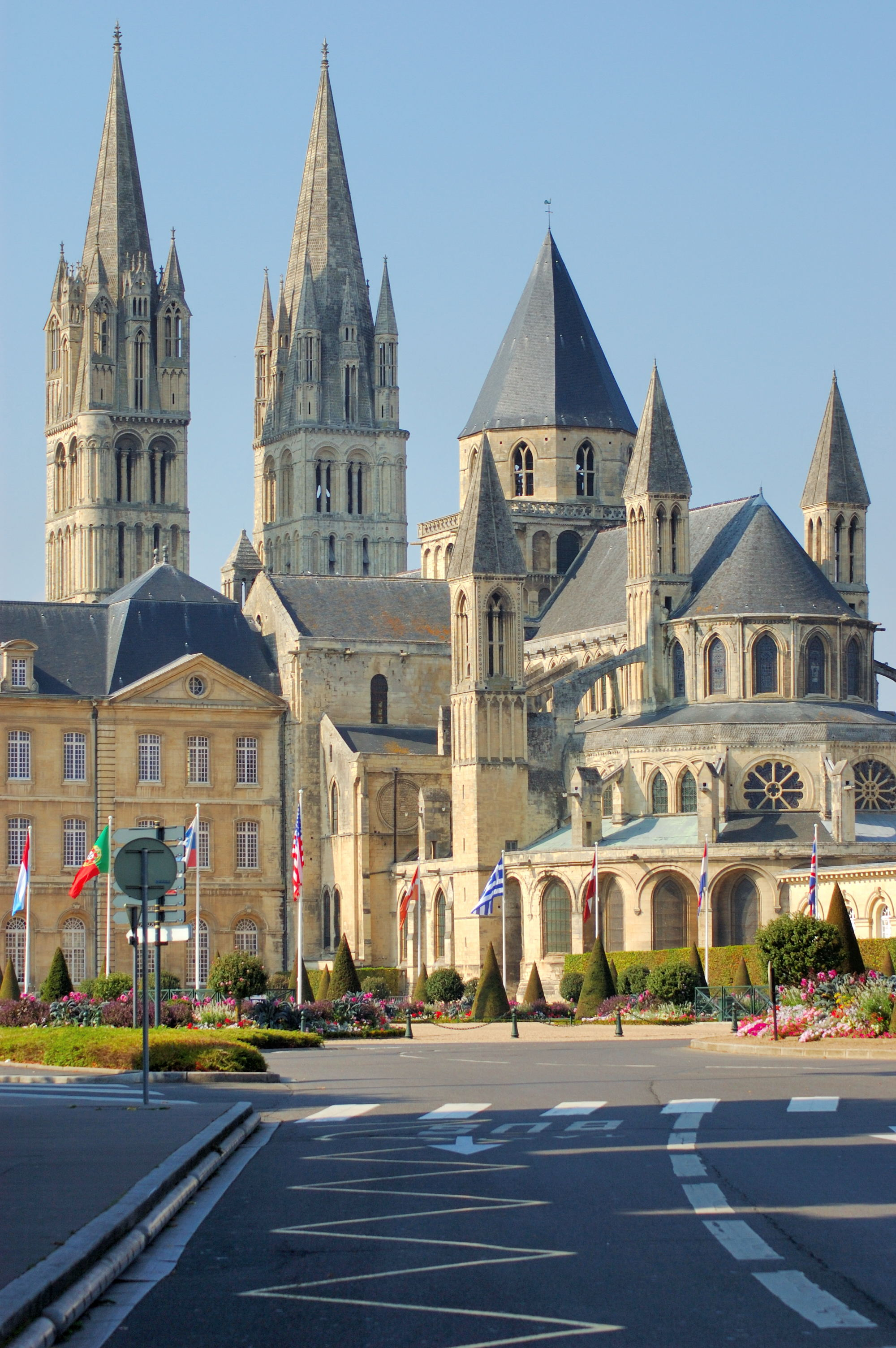
Abbaye aux Hommes, Caen (tall west towers added in the 13th century)

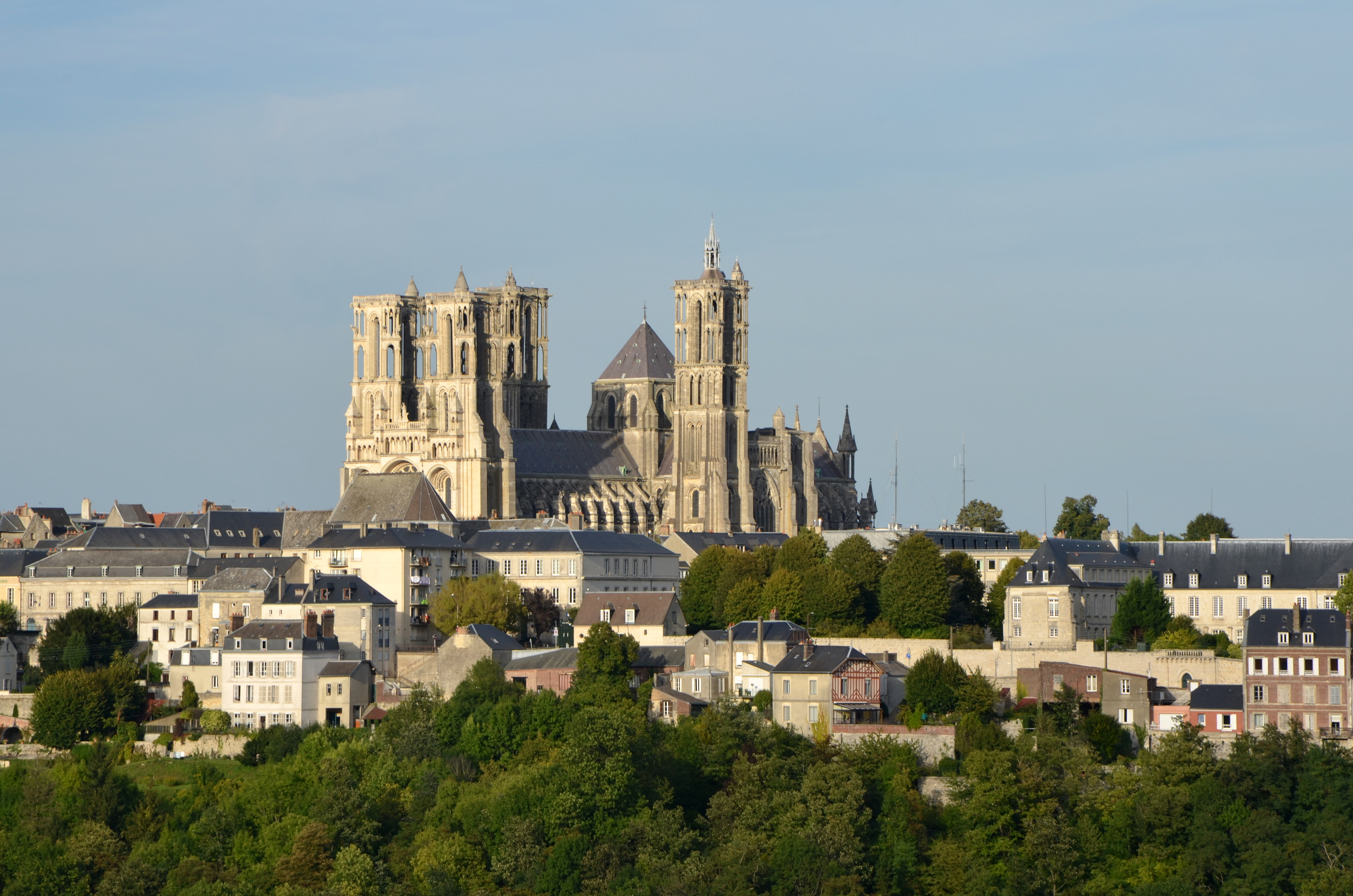
Five clustered towers at Laon Cathedral

The Flamboyant north tower of Chartres Cathedral

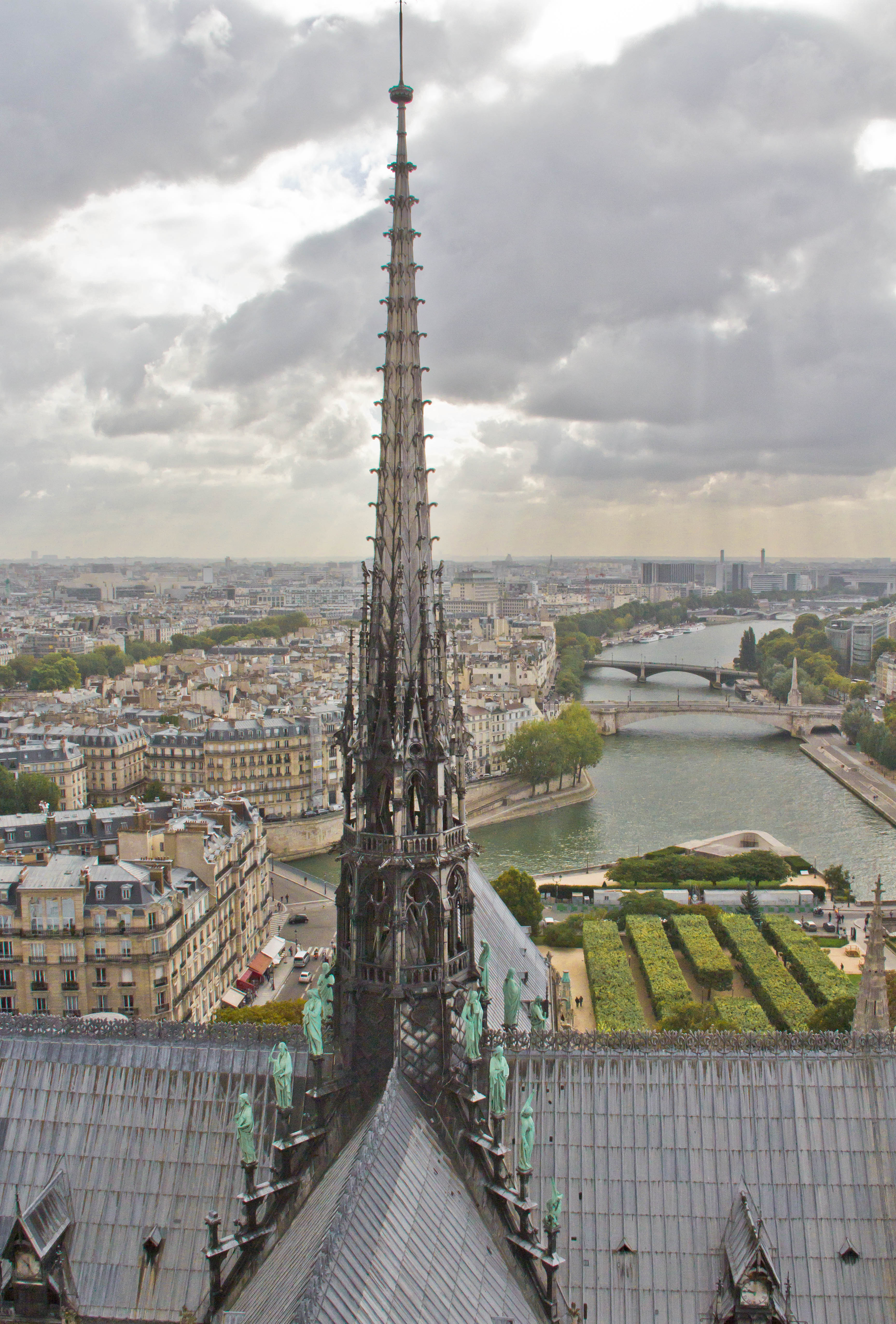
The 19th century flèche of Notre Dame, destroyed by fire in 2019, now restored

In English Gothic, the major tower was generally at the crossing, and was much higher than the others. The most famous example is the spired tower of Salisbury Cathedral, completed in 1320 by William of Farleigh and built upon the 13th century pillars. The 14th century central tower at Wells Cathedral was too heavy for the supporting structure; William Joy constructed scissor arches in the crossing to give the tower additional support. A crossing tower with complex polygonal buttresses was constructed at Canterbury Cathedral in 1493–1501 by John Wastell, its stone exterior concealing a brick structure.

England's Gothic parish churches generally have a single western tower. A number have masonry spires, with those of St James Church, Louth; St Wulfram's Church, Grantham; St Mary Redcliffe in Bristol; and Coventry Cathedral all exceeding 85 m (280 ft) in height. From c. 1400, spires were often omitted, following the example of St Cuthbert's Church, Wells, designed by William Wynford.

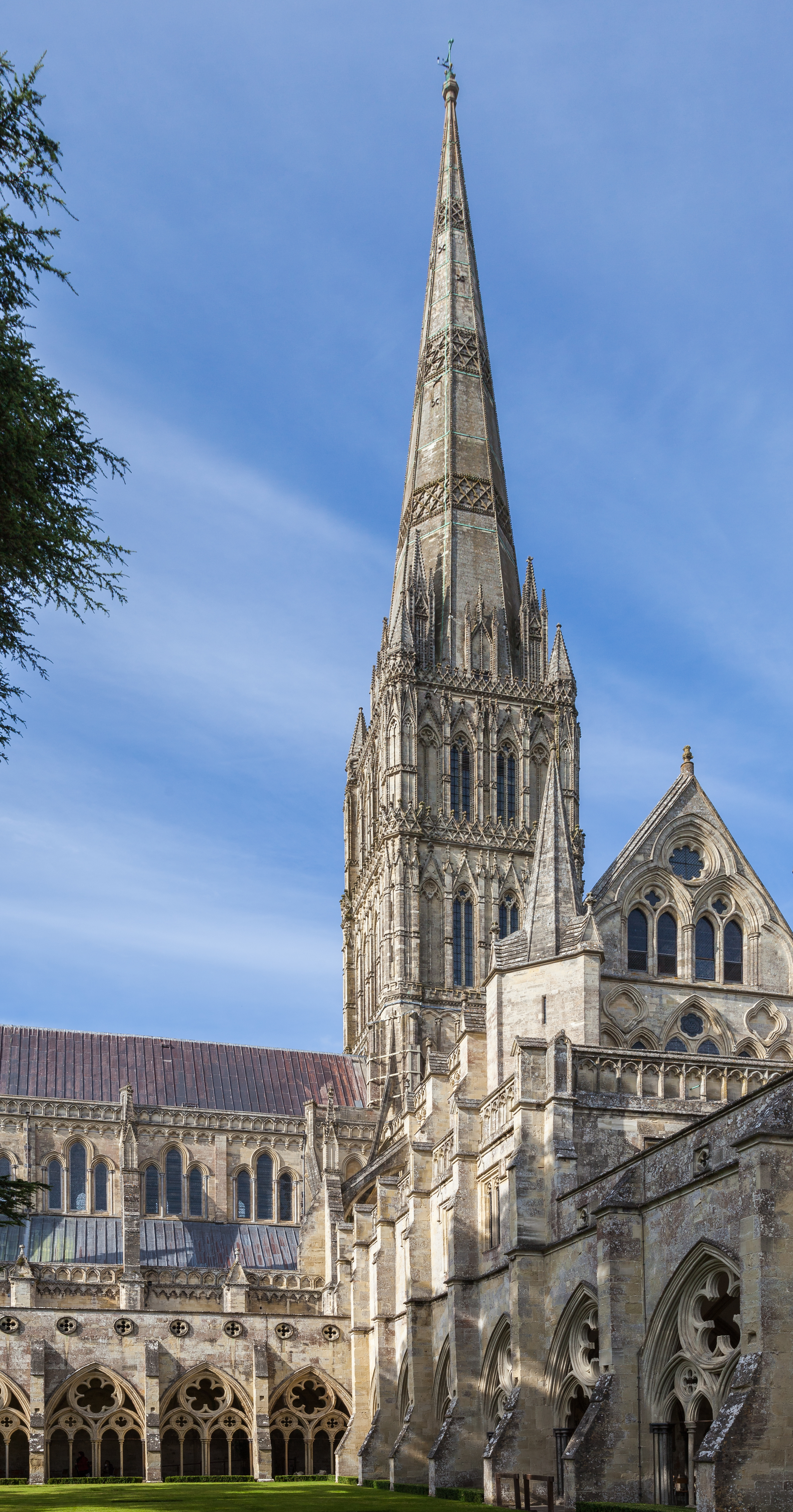
Salisbury Cathedral tower and spire over the crossing (1320)

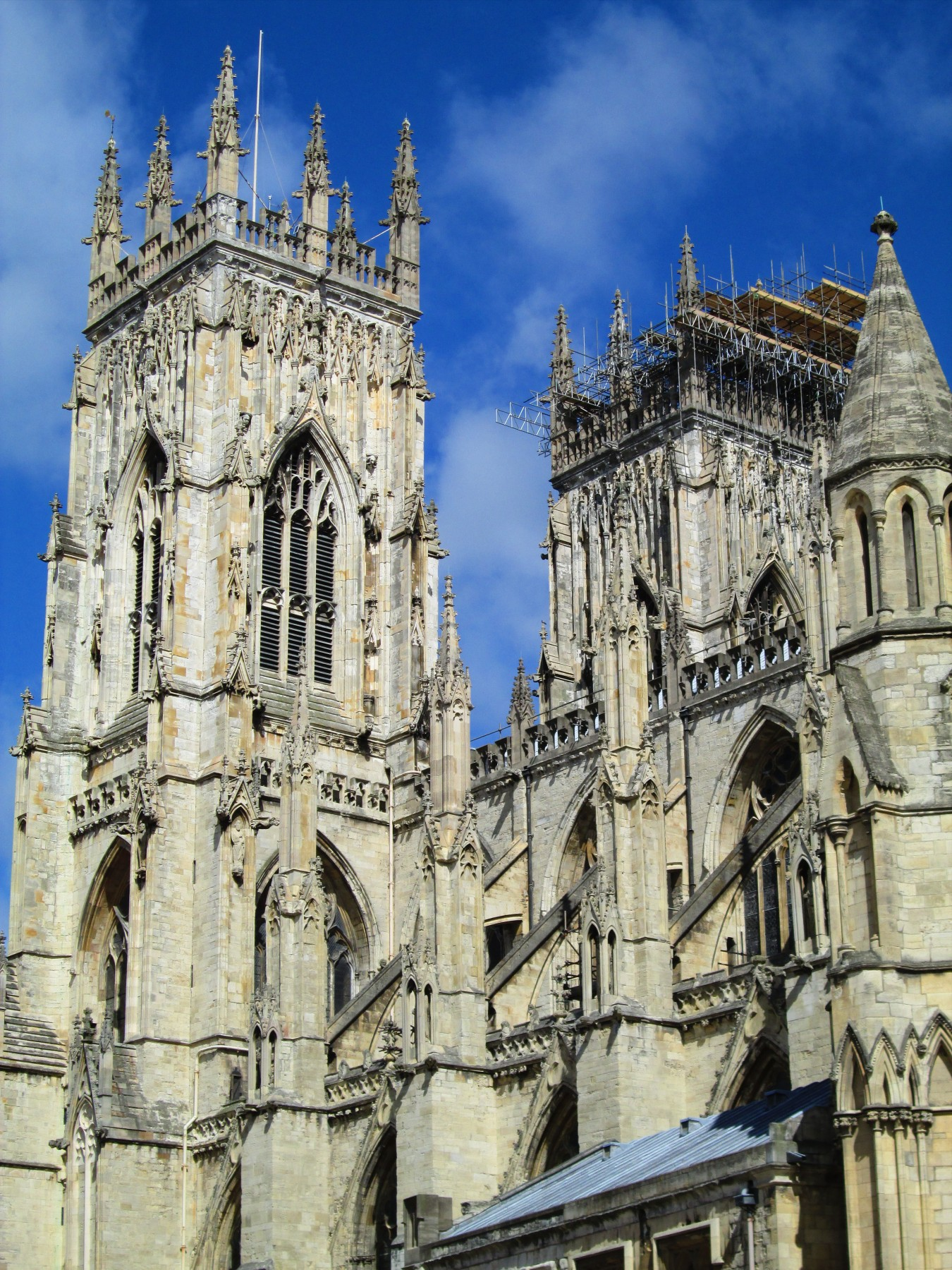
West towers of York Minster, in the Perpendicular Gothic style.

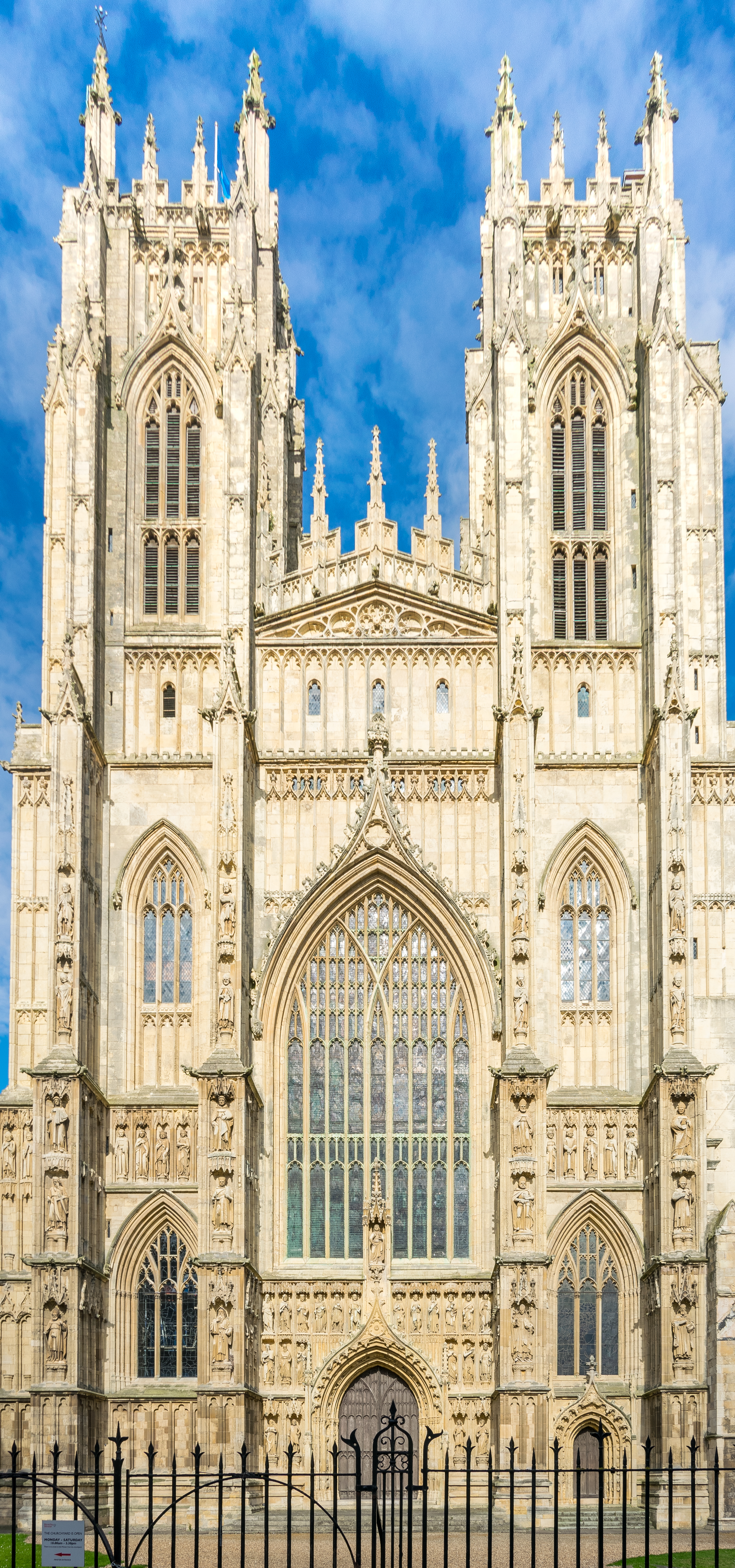
The perpendicular west towers of Beverley Minster (c. 1400)

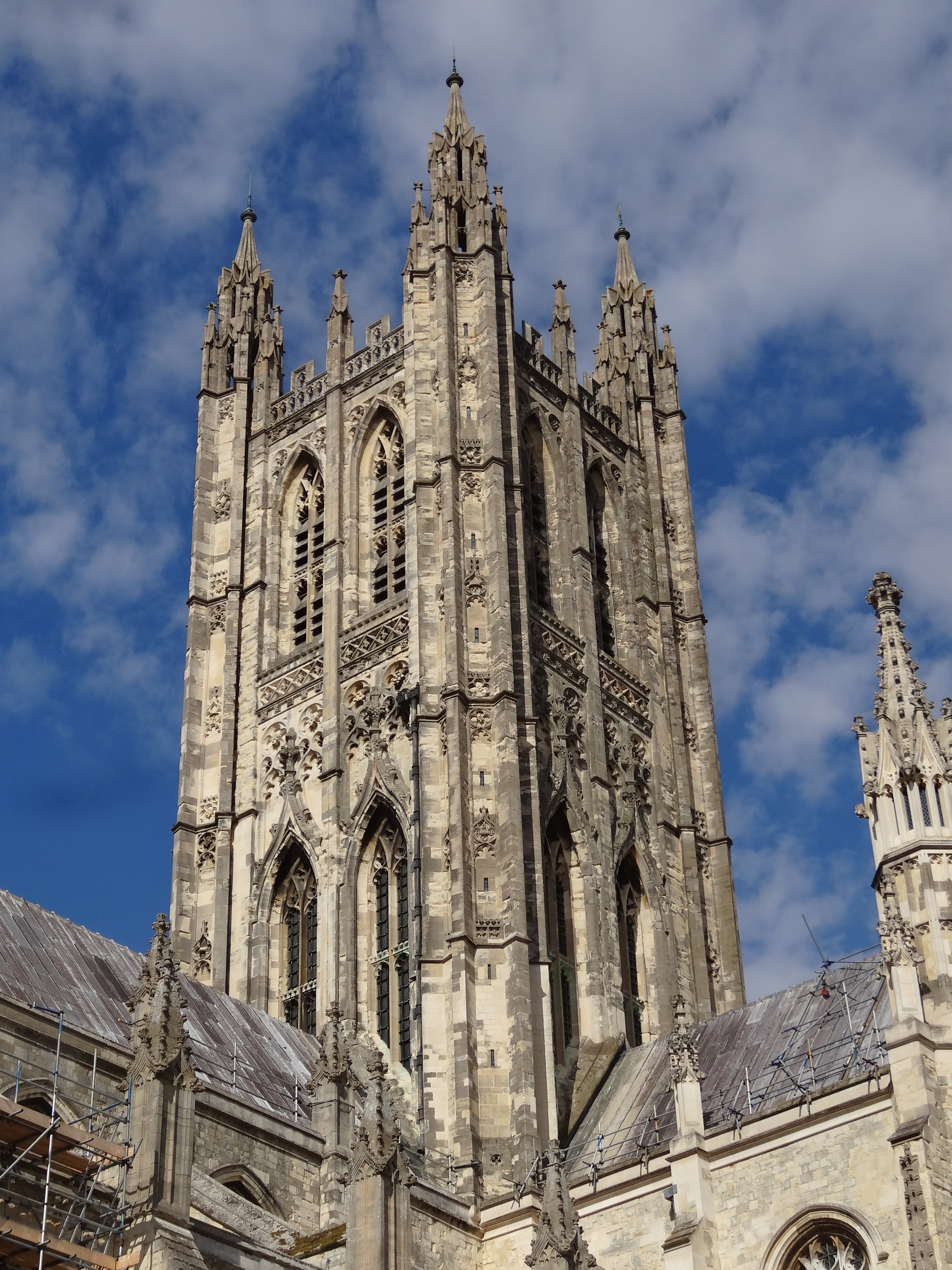
Crossing tower of Canterbury Cathedral (1493–1505)

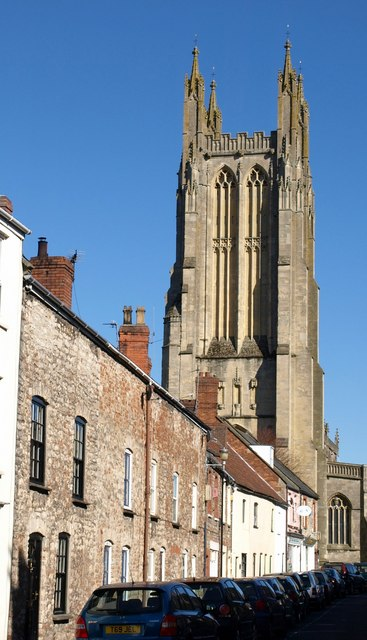
St Cuthbert's Church, Wells

Later Gothic towers in Central Europe often followed the French model, but added even denser decorative tracery. Openwork spires were common, but over-ambitious height meant that construction was often very protracted: Cologne Cathedral and Ulm Minster were both abandoned in the 16th century, and not completed until the 19th century. Burgos Cathedral in Spain was inspired by Germany. It has an exceptional cluster of openwork spires, towers, and pinnacles, drenched with ornament. It was begun in 1444 by a German architect, Juan de Colonia (John of Cologne) and eventually completed by a central tower (1540) built by his grandson.

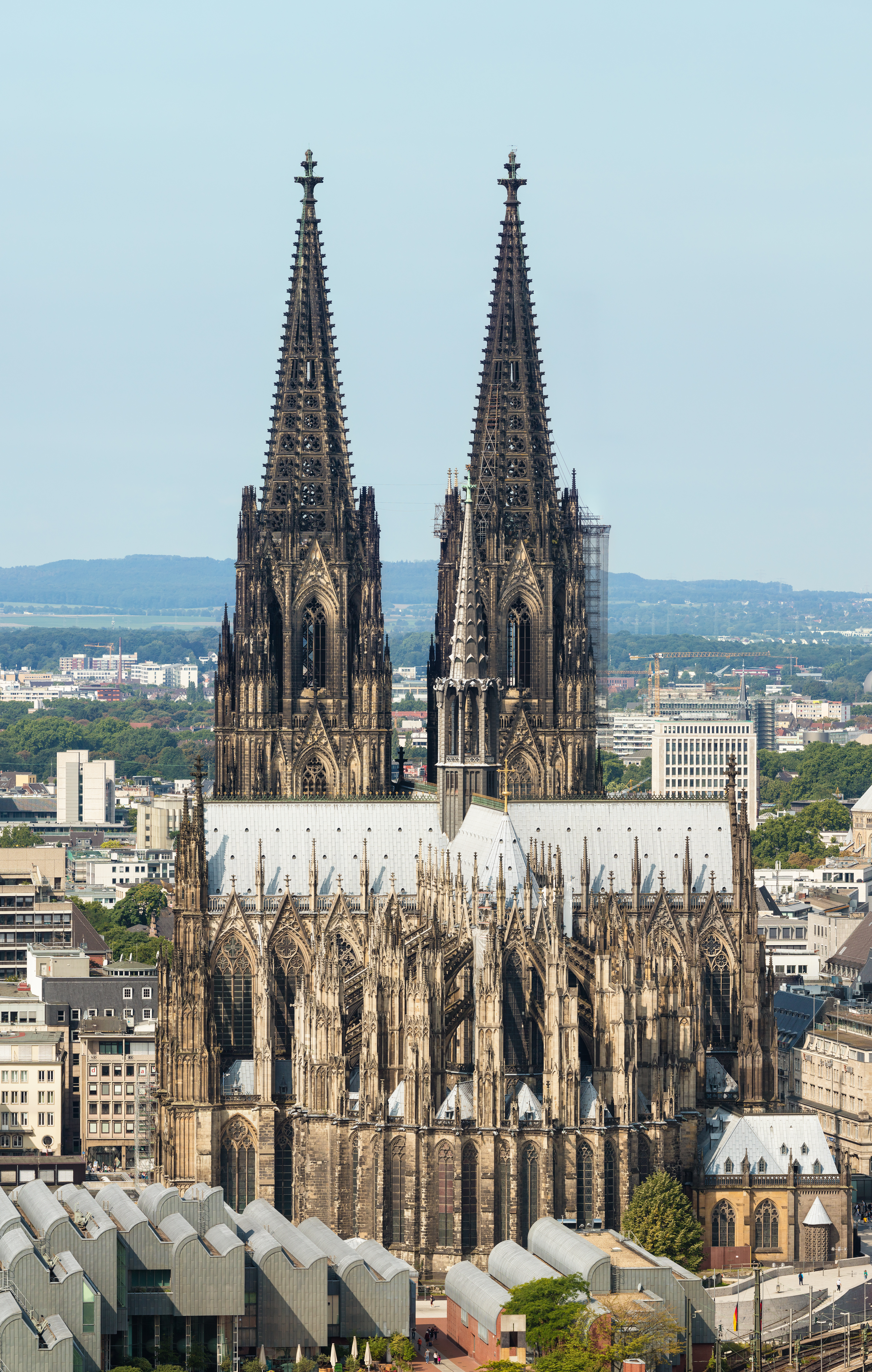
Cologne Cathedral towers (begun 13th century, completed 20th century

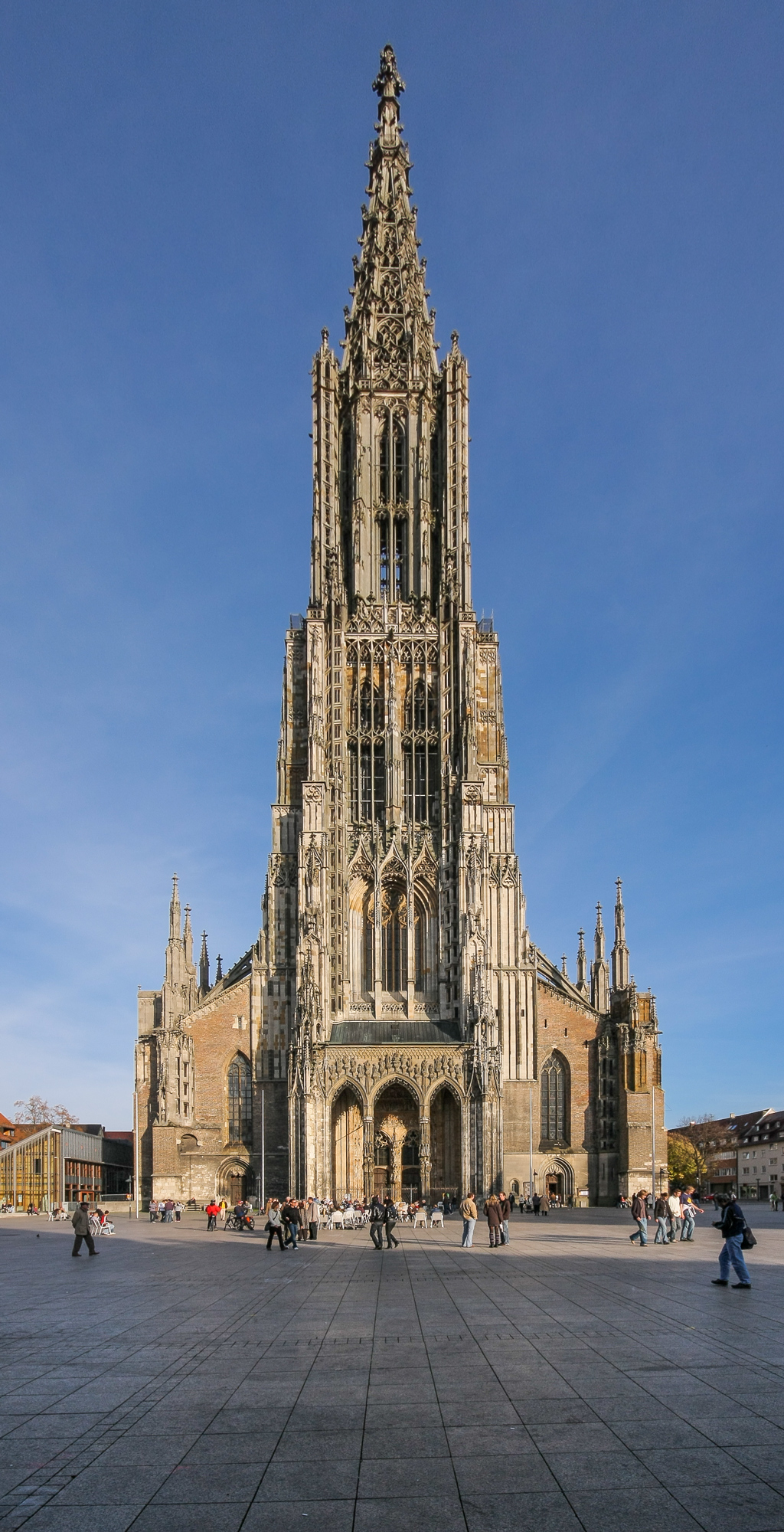
Tower of Ulm Minster (begun 1377, completed 19th century)

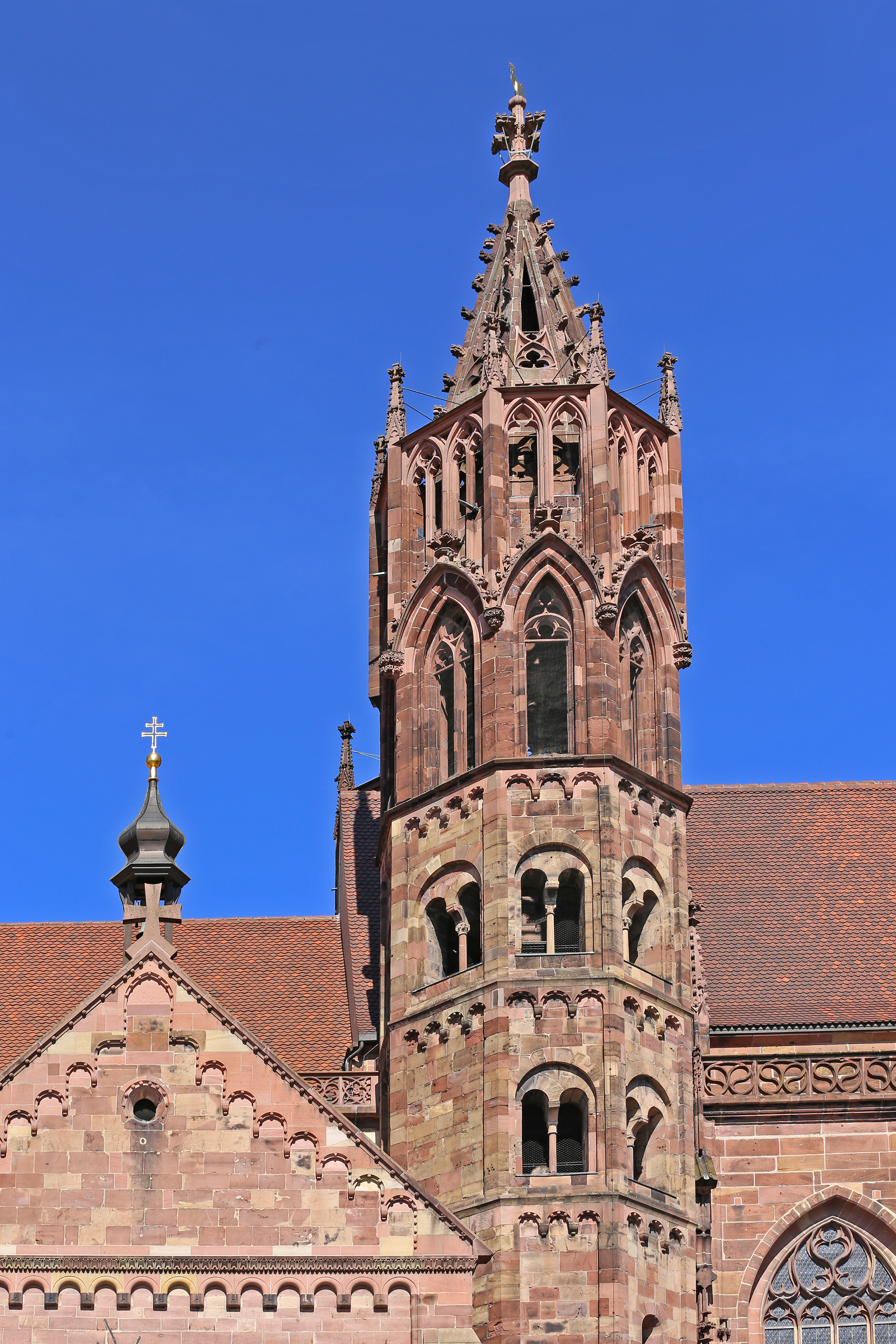
Tower of Freiburg Minster (begun 1340) noted for its lacelike openwork spire

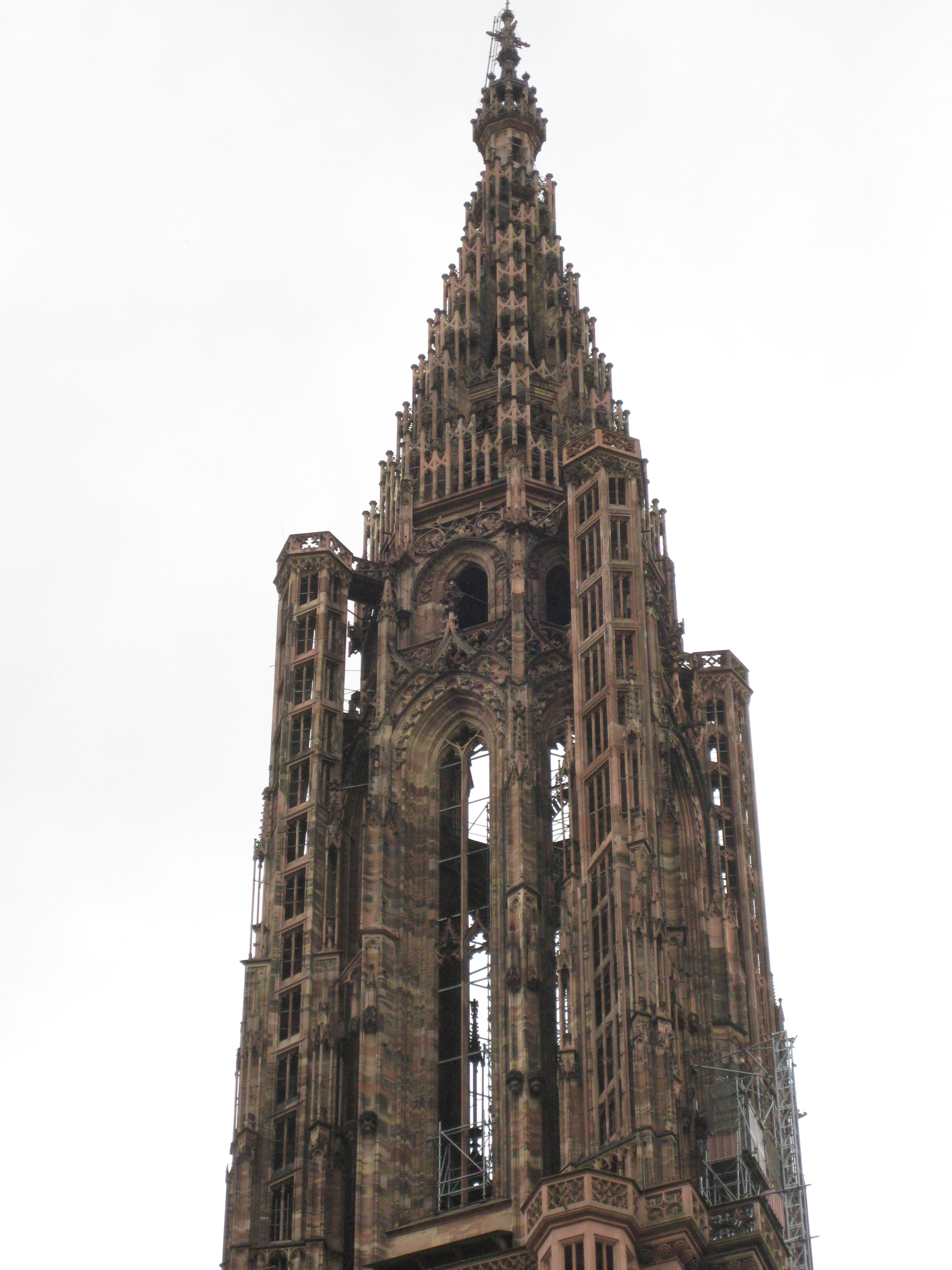
Openwork spire of Strasbourg Cathedral

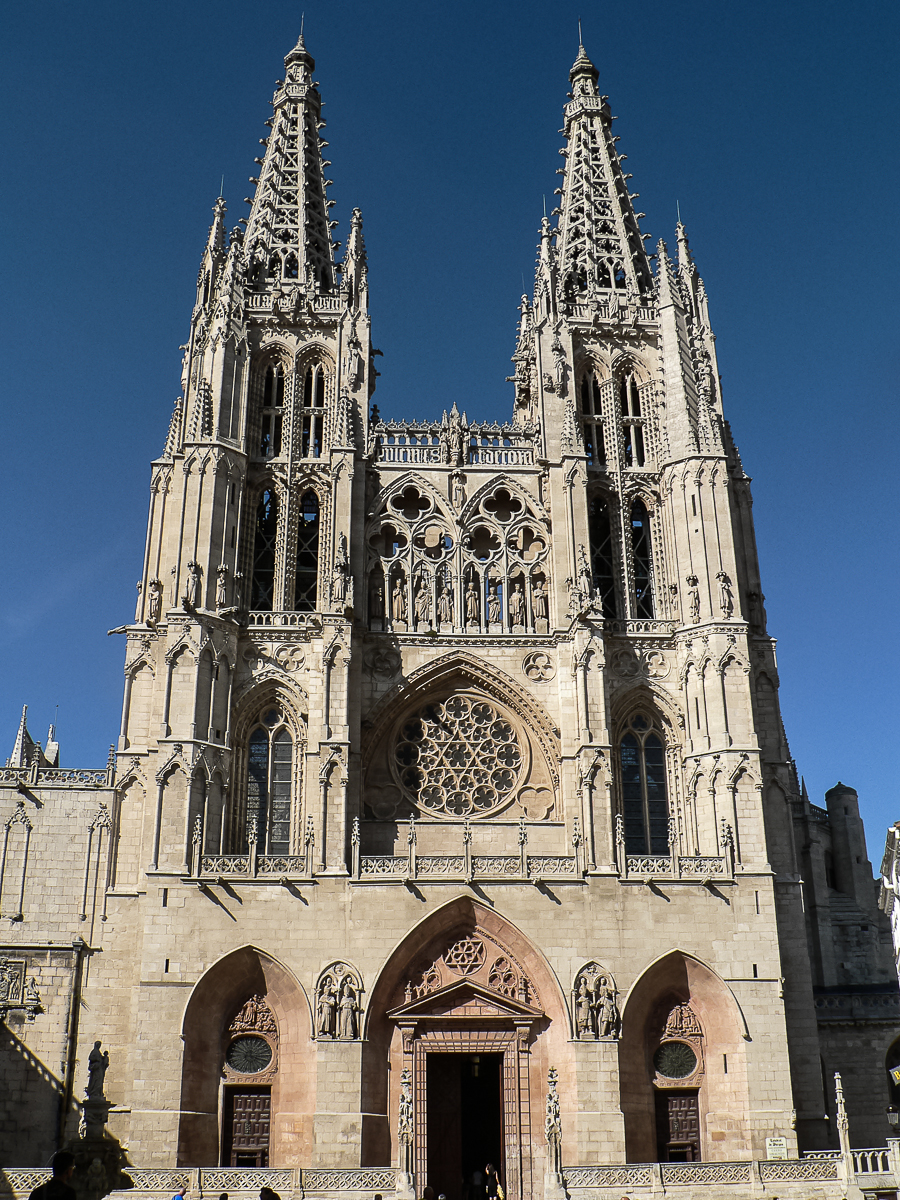
West towers of Burgos Cathedral (1444–1540)

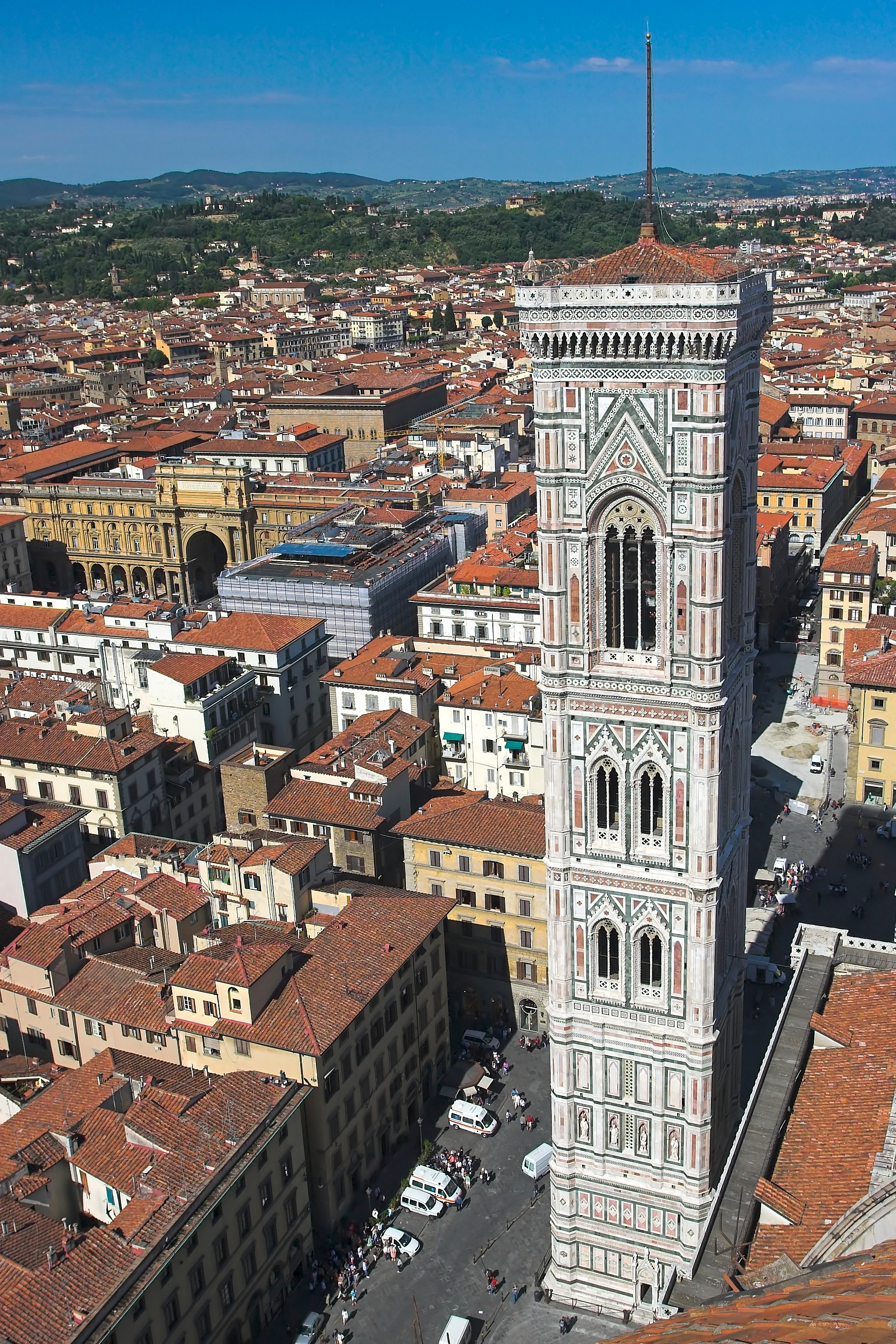
Giotto's Campanile of Florence Cathedral (1334–1359)

In Italy bell towers or campaniles were often separate from the cathedral and differed from northern European forms. The Campanile of Florence Cathedral was built by Giotto in the Florentine Gothic style, decorated with encrustations of polychrome marble. It was originally designed to have a spire.

=== Windows ===
==== Tracery ====
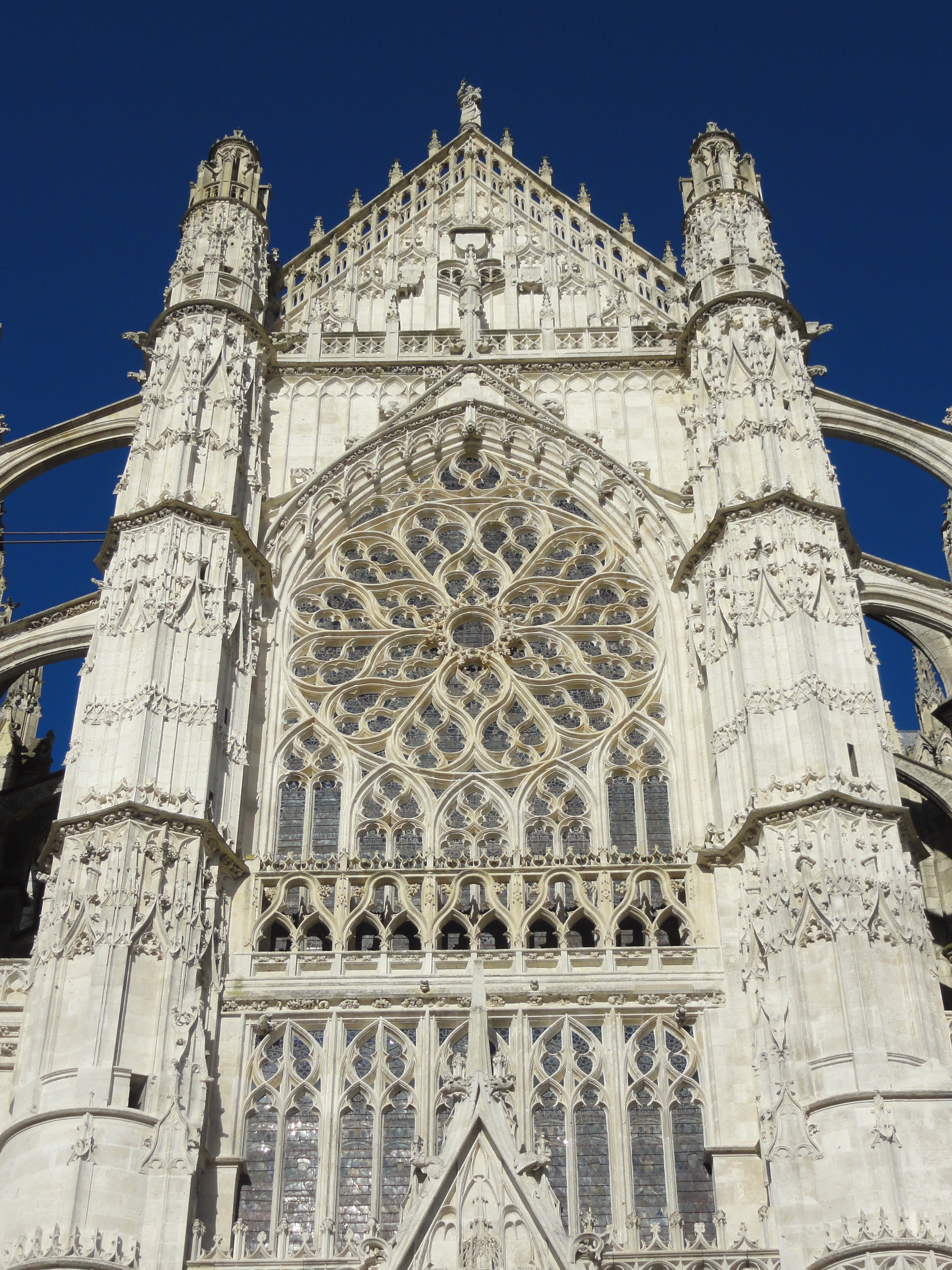
Beauvais Cathedral, south transept (consecrated 1272)

Tracery is an architectural solution by which windows (or screens, panels, and vaults) are divided into sections of various proportions by stone bars or ribs of moulding. Pointed arch windows of Gothic buildings were initially (late 12th–late 13th centuries) lancet windows, a solution typical of the Early Gothic or First Pointed style and of the Early English Gothic. Plate tracery was the first type of tracery to be developed, emerging in the later phase of Early Gothic or First Pointed. Second Pointed is distinguished from First by the appearance of bar–tracery, allowing the construction of much larger window openings, and the development of Curvilinear, Flowing, and Reticulated tracery, ultimately contributing to the Flamboyant style. Late Gothic in most of Europe saw tracery patterns resembling lace develop, while in England Perpendicular Gothic or Third Pointed preferred plainer vertical mullions and transoms. Tracery is practical as well as decorative, because the increasingly large windows of Gothic buildings needed maximum support against the wind.

Plate tracery, in which lights were pierced in a thin wall of ashlar, allowed a window arch to have more than one light – typically two side by side and separated by flat stone spandrels. The spandrels were then sculpted into figures like a roundel or a quatrefoil. Plate tracery reached the height of its sophistication with the 12th century windows of Chartres Cathedral and in the "Dean's Eye" rose window at Lincoln Cathedral.

At the beginning of the 13th century, plate tracery was superseded by bar-tracery. Bar-tracery divides the large lights from one another with moulded mullions. Stone bar-tracery, an important decorative element of Gothic styles, first was used at Reims Cathedral shortly after 1211, in the chevet built by Jean D'Orbais. It was employed in England around 1240. After 1220, master builders in England had begun to treat the window openings as a series of openings divided by thin stone bars, while before 1230 the apse chapels of Reims Cathedral were decorated with bar-tracery with cusped circles (with bars radiating from the centre). Bar-tracery became common after c. 1240, with increasing complexity and decreasing weight. The lines of the mullions continued beyond the tops of the window lights and subdivided the open spandrels above the lights into a variety of decorative shapes. Rayonnant style (c. 1230 – c. 1350) was enabled by the development of bar-tracery in Continental Europe and is named for the radiation of lights around a central point in circular rose windows. Rayonnant also deployed mouldings of two different types in tracery, where earlier styles had used moulding of a single size, with different sizes of mullions. The rose windows of Notre-Dame de Paris (c.1270) are typical.

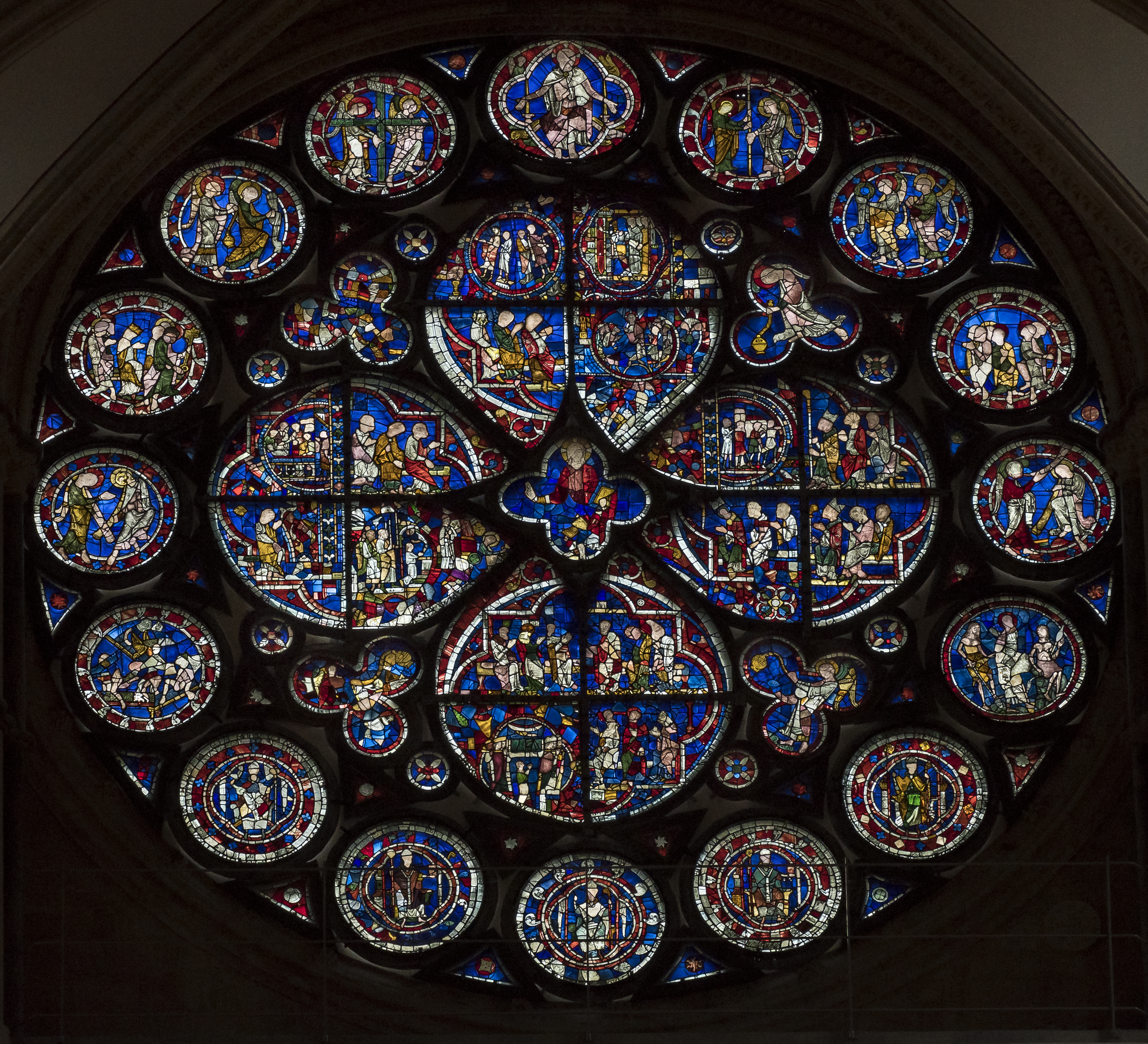
Plate tracery, Lincoln Cathedral "Dean's Eye" rose window (c.1225)

The early phase of Middle Pointed style (late 13th century) is characterized by Geometrical tracery – simple bar-tracery forming patterns of foiled arches and circles interspersed with triangular lights. The mullions of Geometrical style typically had capitals with curved bars emerging from them. Intersecting bar-tracery (c.1300) deployed mullions without capitals which branched off equidistant to the window-head. The window-heads themselves were formed of equal curves forming a pointed arch and the tracery-bars were curved by drawing curves with differing radii from the same centres as the window-heads. The mullions were in consequence branched into Y-shaped designs further ornamented with cusps. The intersecting branches produced an array of lozenge-shaped lights in between numerous lancet arched lights.Y-tracery was often employed in two-light windows c.1300.

Second Pointed (14th century) saw Intersecting tracery elaborated with ogees, creating a complex reticular (net-like) design known as Reticulated tracery. Second Pointed architecture deployed tracery in highly decorated fashion known as Curvilinear and Flowing (Undulating). These types of bar-tracery were developed further throughout Europe in the 15th century into the Flamboyant style, named for the characteristic flame-shaped spaces between the tracery-bars. These shapes are known as daggers, fish-bladders, or mouchettes.

Third Pointed or Perpendicular Gothic developed in England from the later 14th century and is typified by Rectilinear tracery (panel-tracery). The mullions are often joined by transoms and continue up their straight vertical lines to the top of the window's main arch, some branching off into lesser arches, and creating a series of panel-like lights. Perpendicular strove for verticality and dispensed with the Curvilinear style's sinuous lines in favour of unbroken straight mullions from top to bottom, transected by horizontal transoms and bars. Four-centred arches were used in the 15th and 16th centuries to create windows of increasing size with flatter window-heads, often filling the entire wall of the bay between each buttress. The windows were themselves divided into panels of lights topped by pointed arches struck from four centres. The transoms were often topped by miniature crenellations. The windows at Cambridge of King's College Chapel (1446–1515) represent the heights of Perpendicular tracery.

Tracery was used on both the interior and exterior of buildings. It frequently covered the façades, and the interior walls of the nave and choir were covered with blind arcades. It also often picked up and repeated the designs in the stained glass windows. Strasbourg Cathedral has a west front lavishly ornamented with bar tracery matching the windows.

Lancets, Ripon Cathedral west front (c.1220)

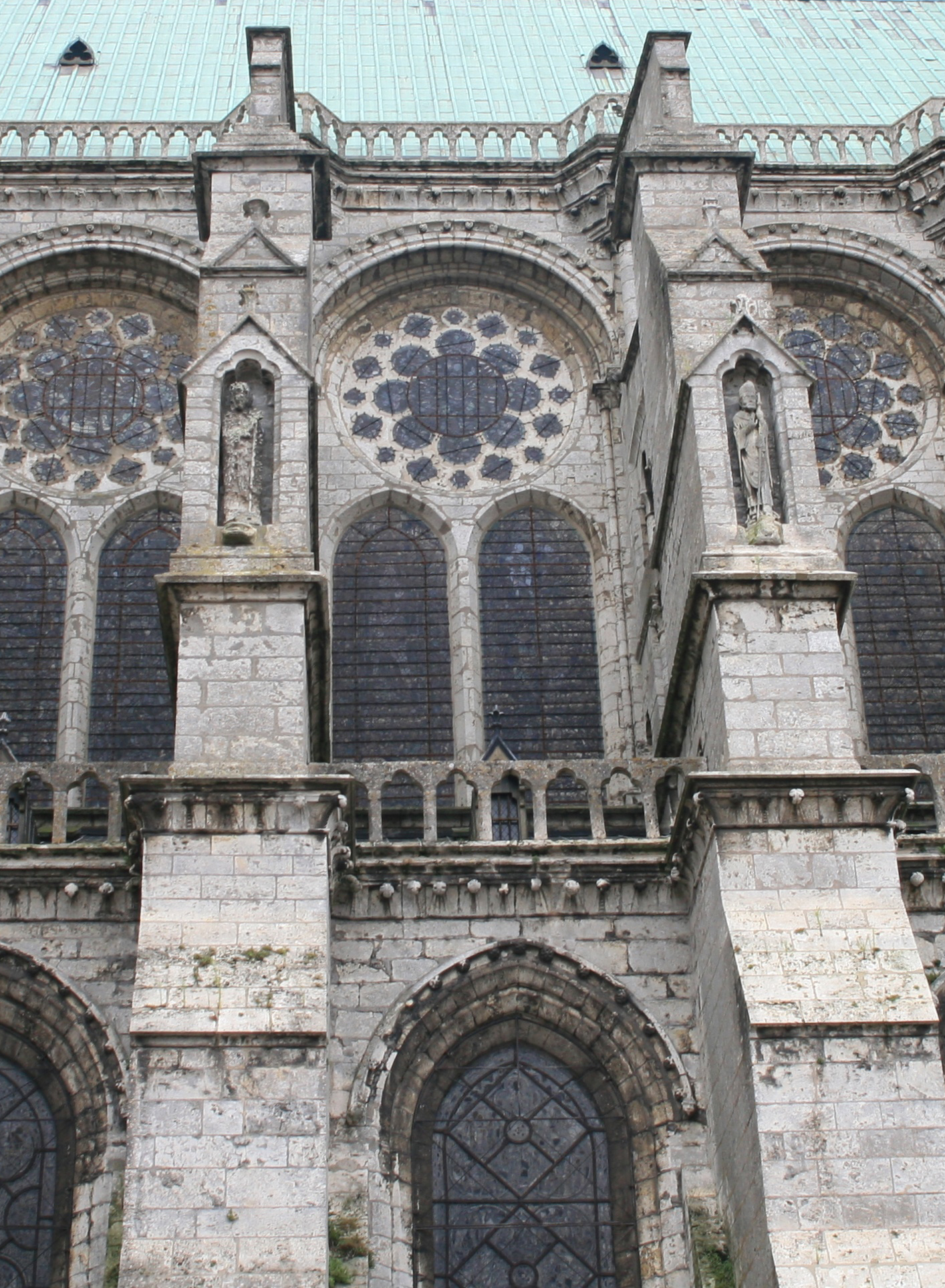
Plate tracery, Chartres Cathedral clerestory (1194–1220)

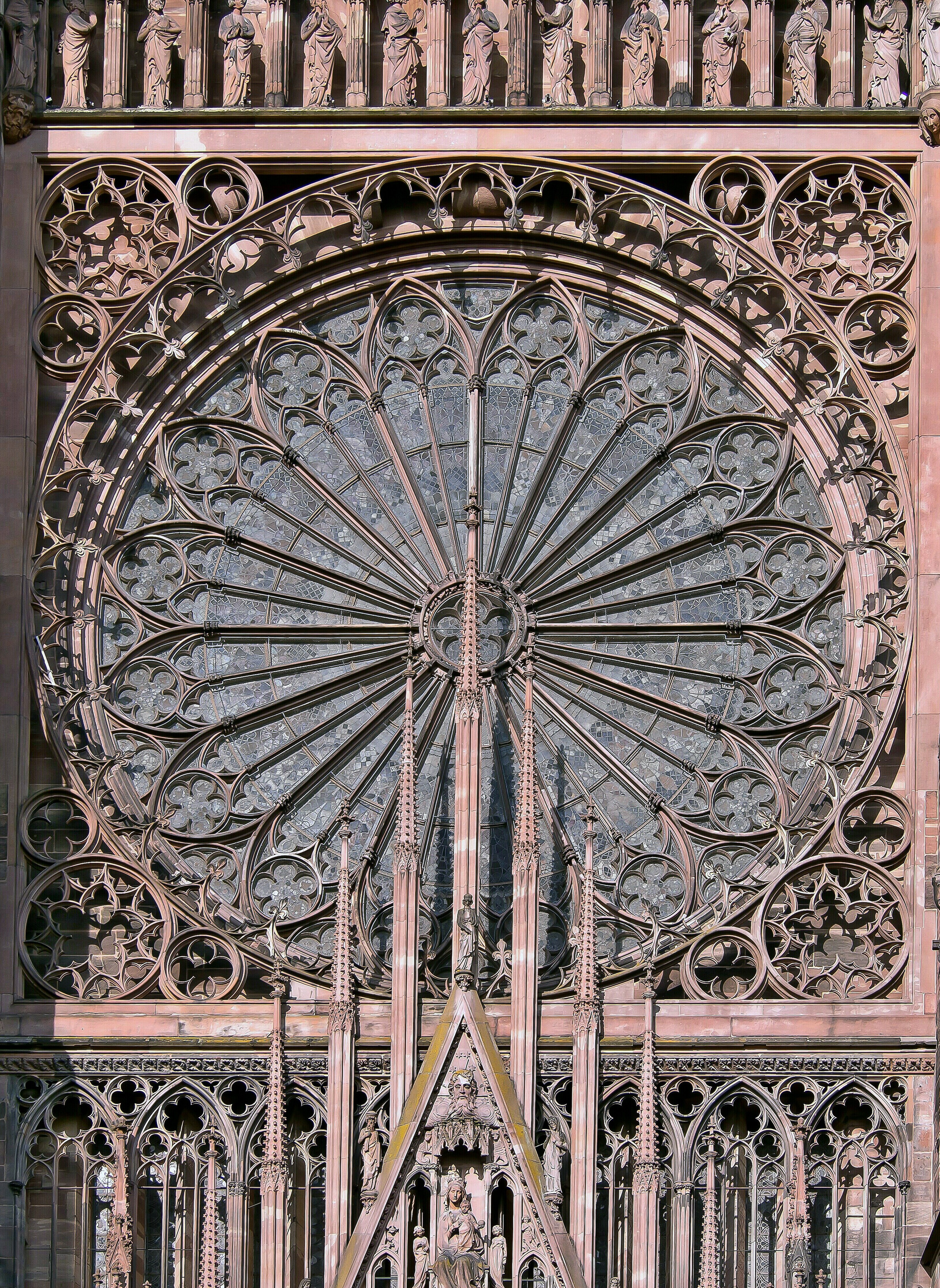
Rayonnant rose window, Strasbourg Cathedral west front

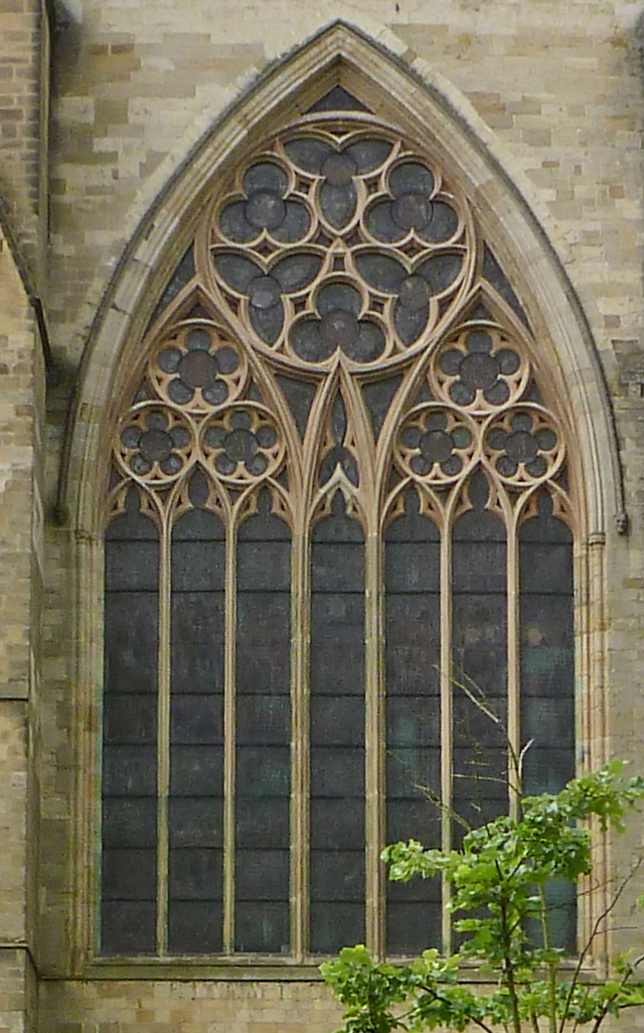
Geometrical Decorated, Ripon Cathedral east window

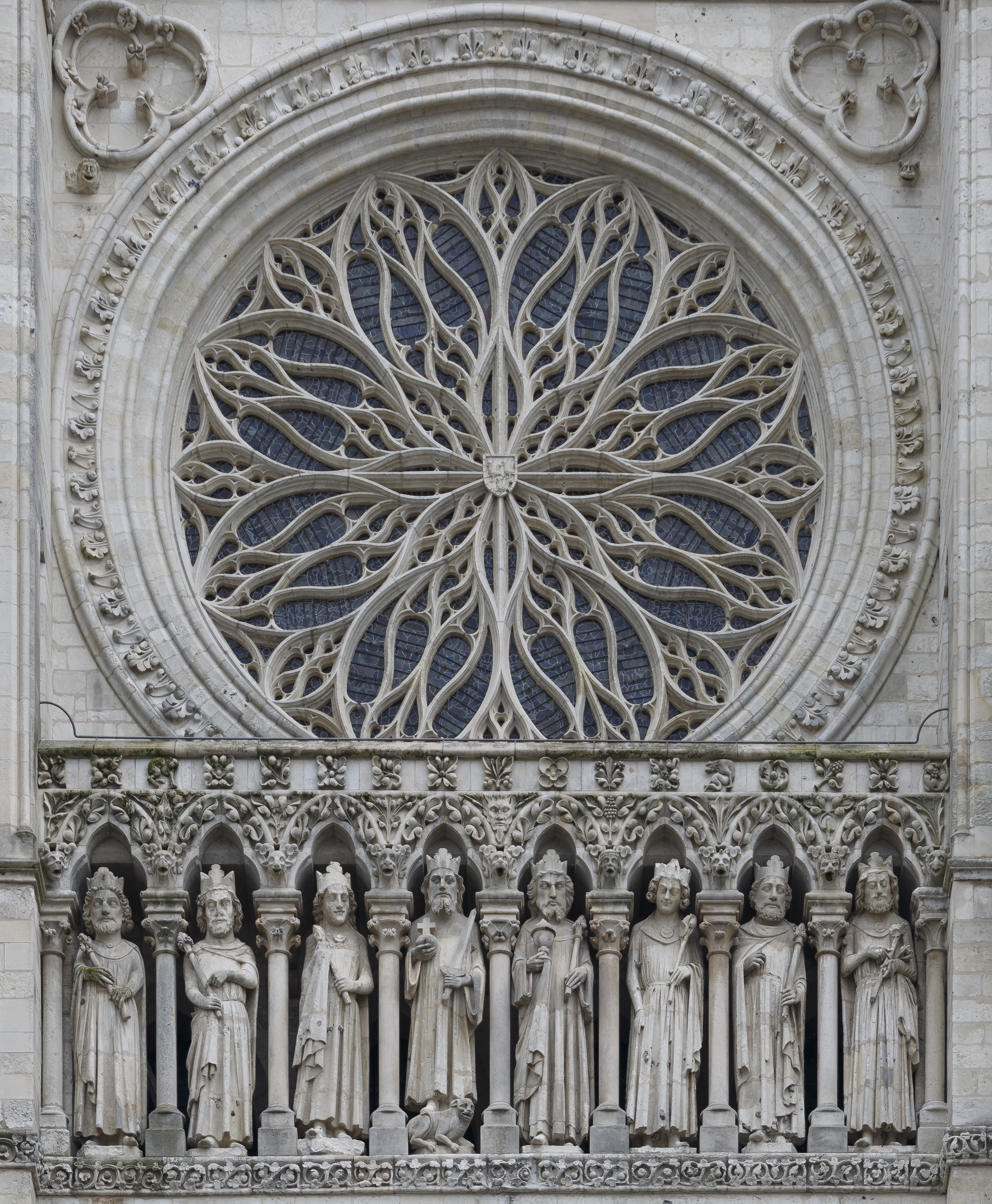
Flamboyant rose window, Amiens Cathedral west front

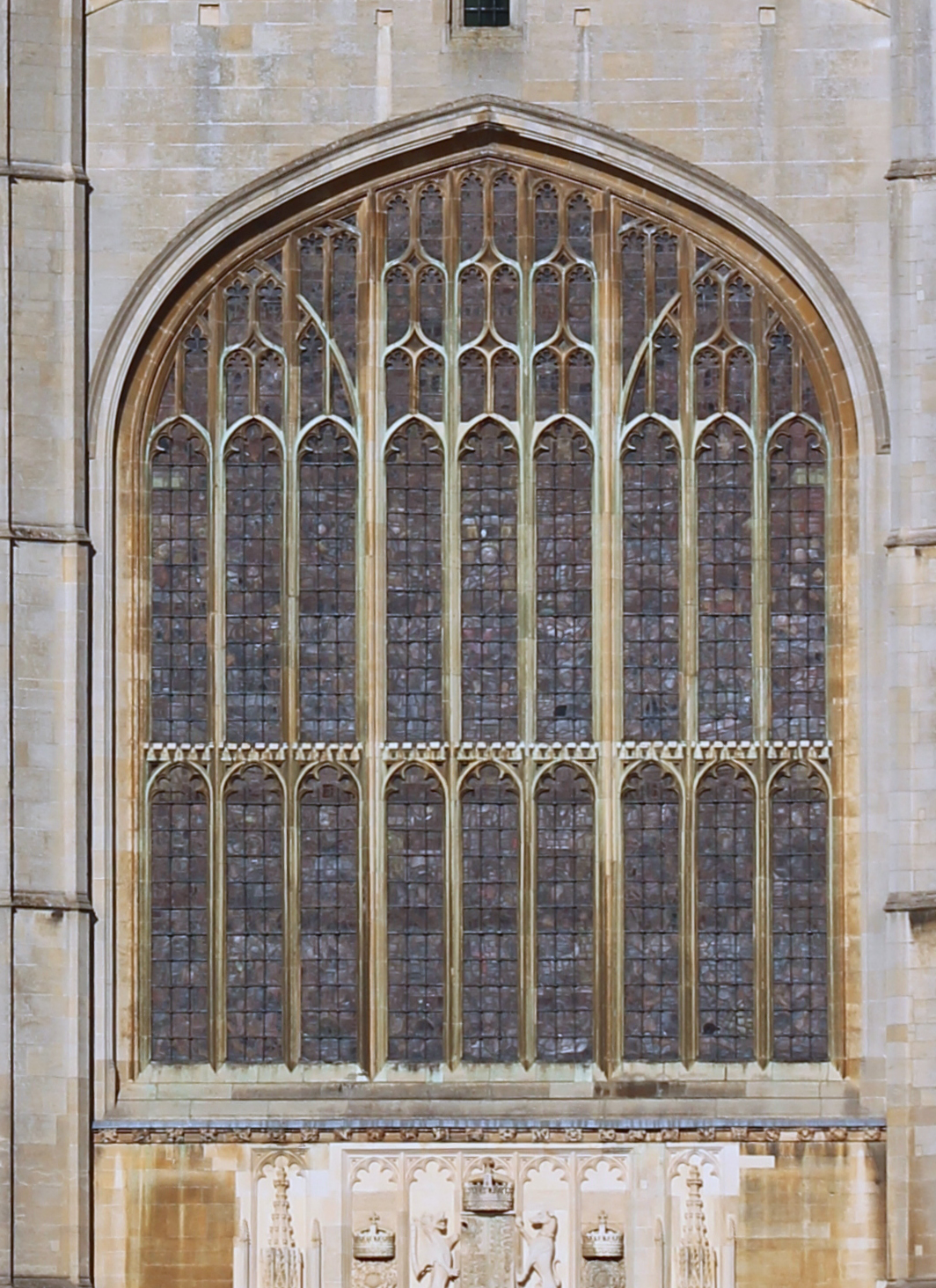
Perpendicular, King's College Chapel, Cambridge, west front

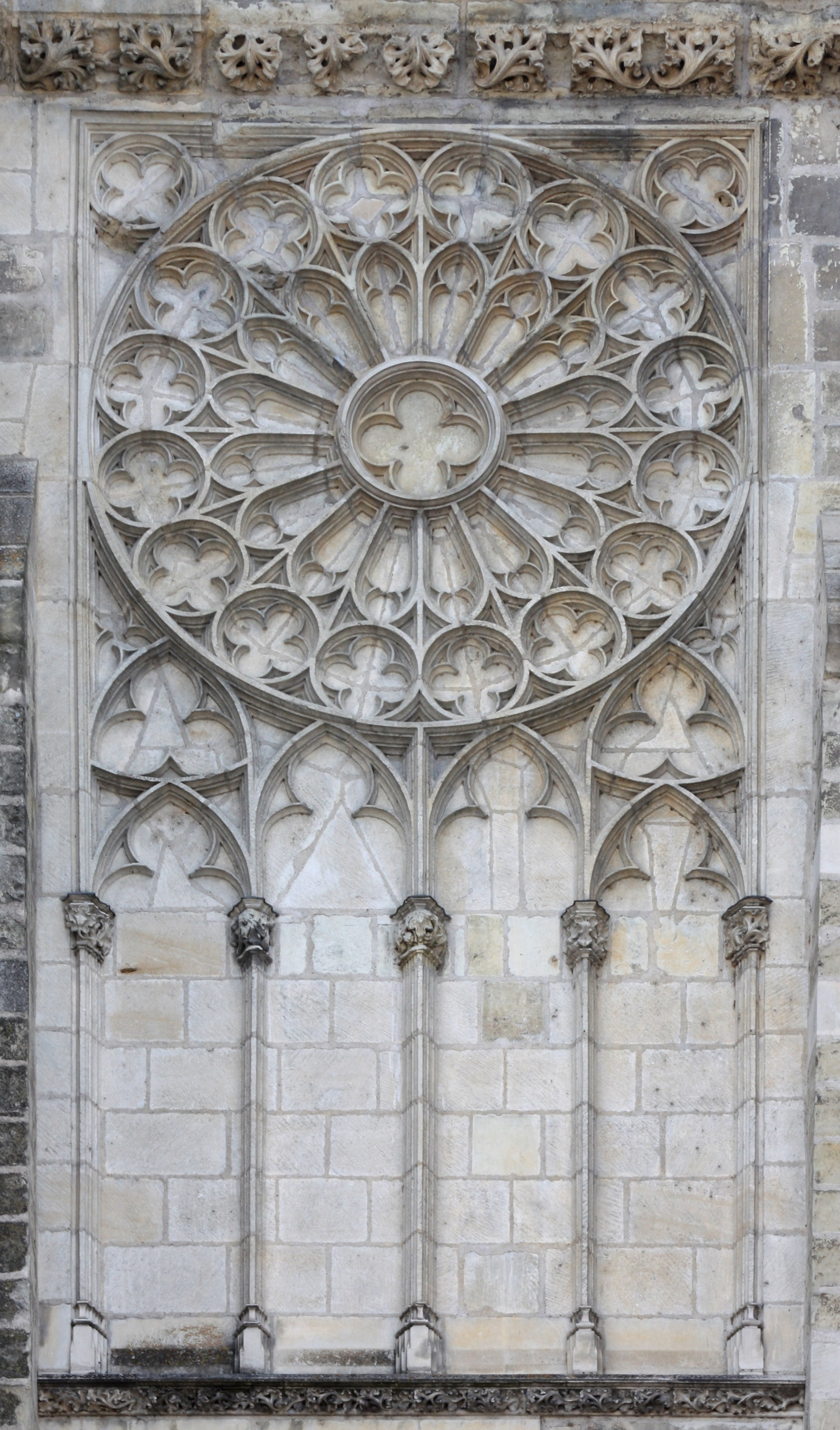
Blind tracery, Tours Cathedral (16th century)

==== Stained glass ====
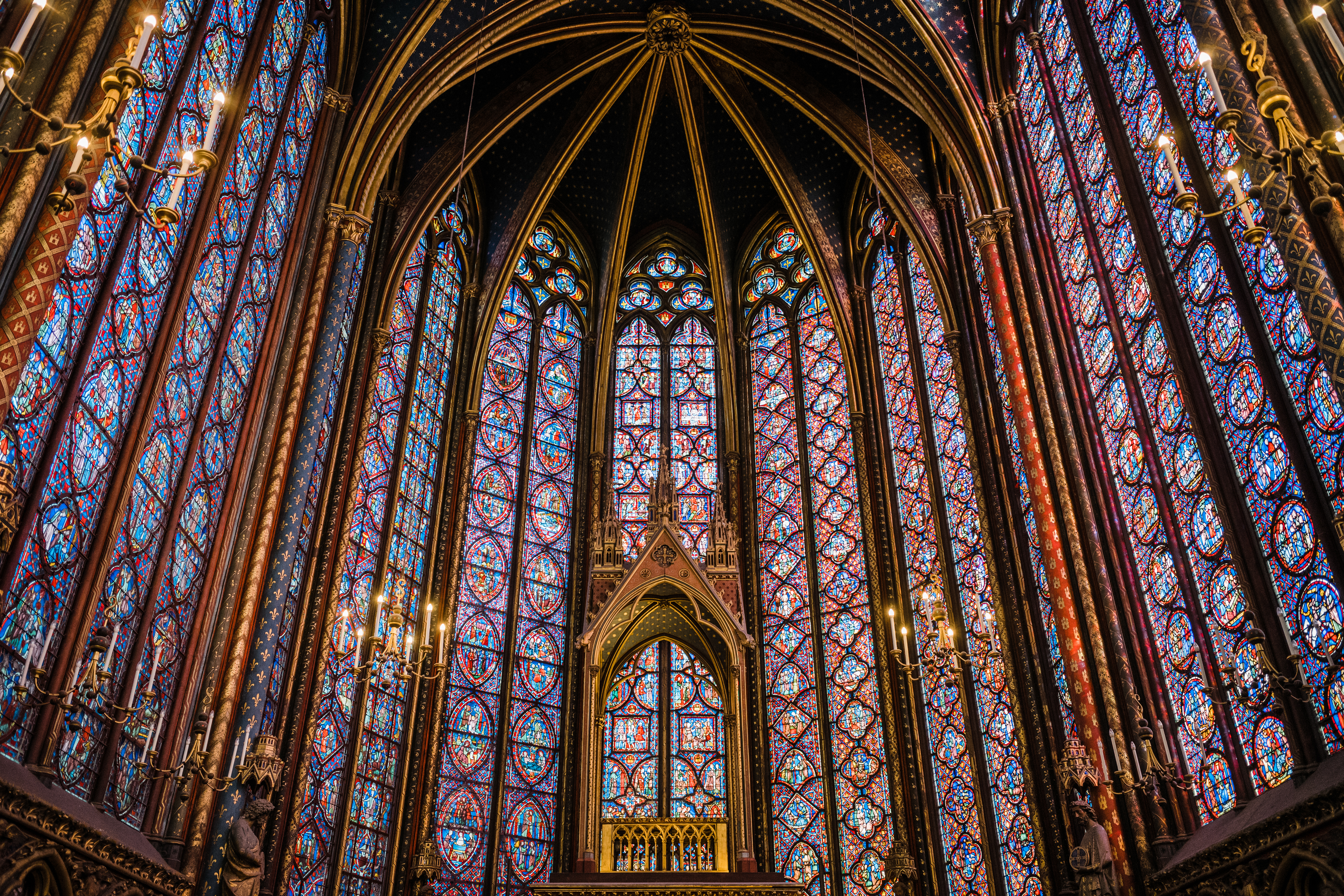
Windows of Sainte-Chapelle (13th century)

Increasing the amount of light in the interior was a primary objective of the founders of the Gothic movement. Abbot Suger described the new kind of architecture he had created in the east end of the Saint-Denis: "a circular ring of chapels, by virtue of which the whole church would shine with the wonderful and uninterrupted light of most luminous windows, pervading the interior beauty."

Religious teachings in the Middle Ages, particularly the writings of Pseudo-Dionysius the Areopagite, a 6th-century mystic whose book, De Coelesti Hierarchia, was popular among monks in France, taught that all light was divine. When the Abbot Suger ordered the reconstruction of choir of the abbey church at Saint-Denis, he had the builders create seventy windows, admitting as much light as possible, as the means by which the faithful could be elevated from the material world to the immaterial world.

The placement of the windows was also determined by religious doctrine. The windows on the north side, frequently in the shade, had windows depicting the Old Testament. The windows of the east, corresponding to the direction of the sunrise, had images of Christ and scenes from the New Testament.

In the Early Gothic period, the glass was particularly thick and was deeply coloured with metal oxides; cobalt for blue, copper for a ruby red, iron for green, and antimony for yellow. The process of making the windows was described in detail by the 12th-century monk known as Theophilus Presbyter. The glass of each colour was melted with the oxide, blown, shaped into small sheets, cracked with a hot iron into small pieces, and assembled on a large table. The details were painted onto the glass in vitreous enamel, then baked in a kiln to fuse the enamel on the glass. The pieces were fit into a framework of thin lead strips, and then put into a more solid frame or iron armatures between the panels. The finished window was set into the stone opening. Thin vertical and horizontal bars of iron, called vergettes or barlotierres, were placed inside the window to reinforce the glass against the wind.

The use of iron rods between the panels of glass and a framework of stone mullions, or ribs, made it possible to create much larger windows. The three rose windows at Chartres (1203–1240) each were more than 12 m (40 ft) in diameter. Larger windows also appeared at York Minster (1140–1160) and Canterbury Cathedral (1178–1200)

The stained glass windows were extremely complex and expensive to create. King Louis IX paid for the rose windows in the transept of Notre-Dame de Paris, but other windows were financed by the contributions of the professions or guilds of the city. These windows usually had a panel which illustrated the work of the guild which funded it, such as the drapers, stonemasons, or coopers.

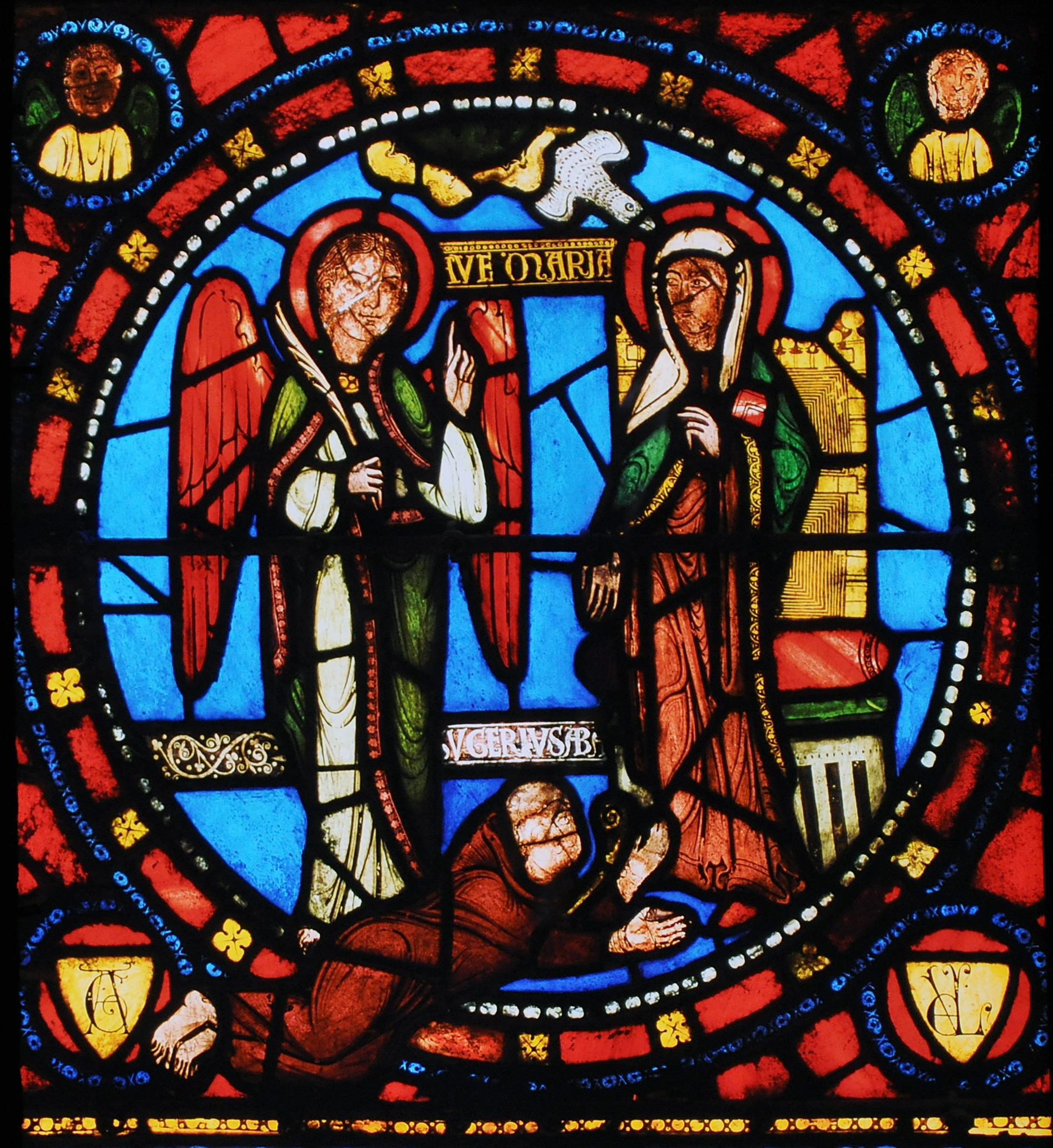
Abbey of Saint-Denis, Abbot Suger represented at feet of Virgin Mary (12th century)

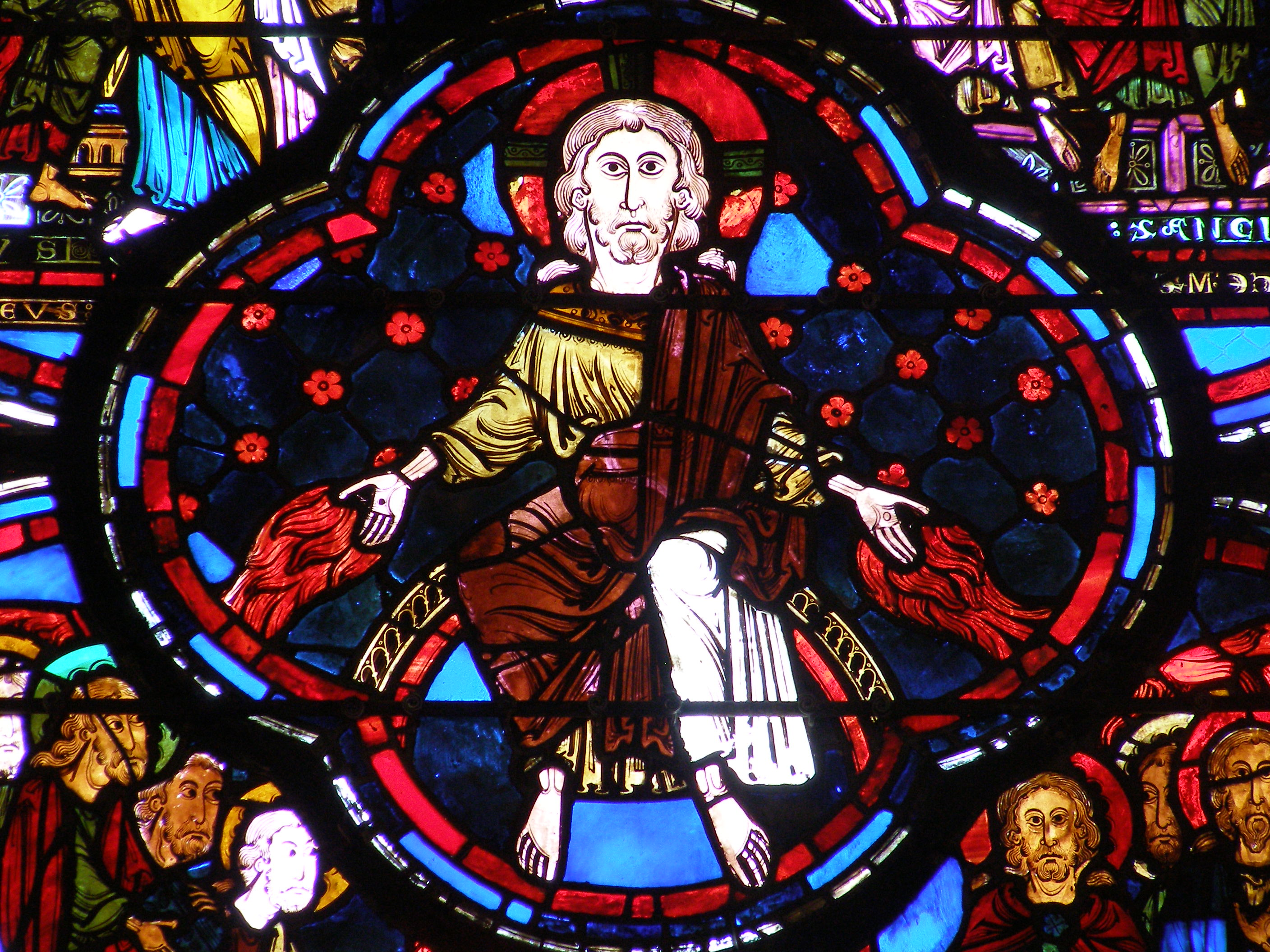
Detail of the Apocalypse window, Bourges Cathedral, early 13th century

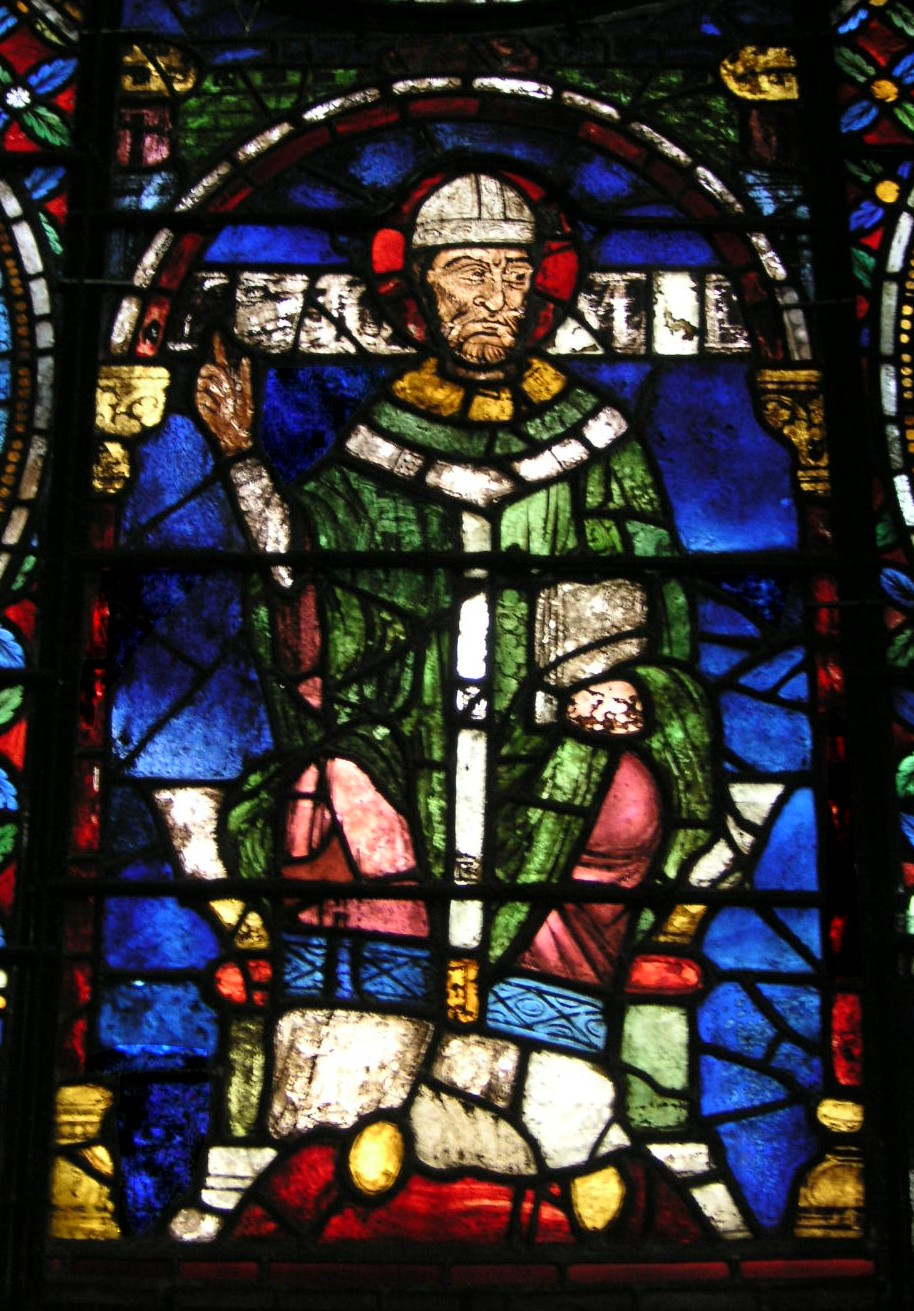
Thomas Becket figure from Canterbury Cathedral (13th century)

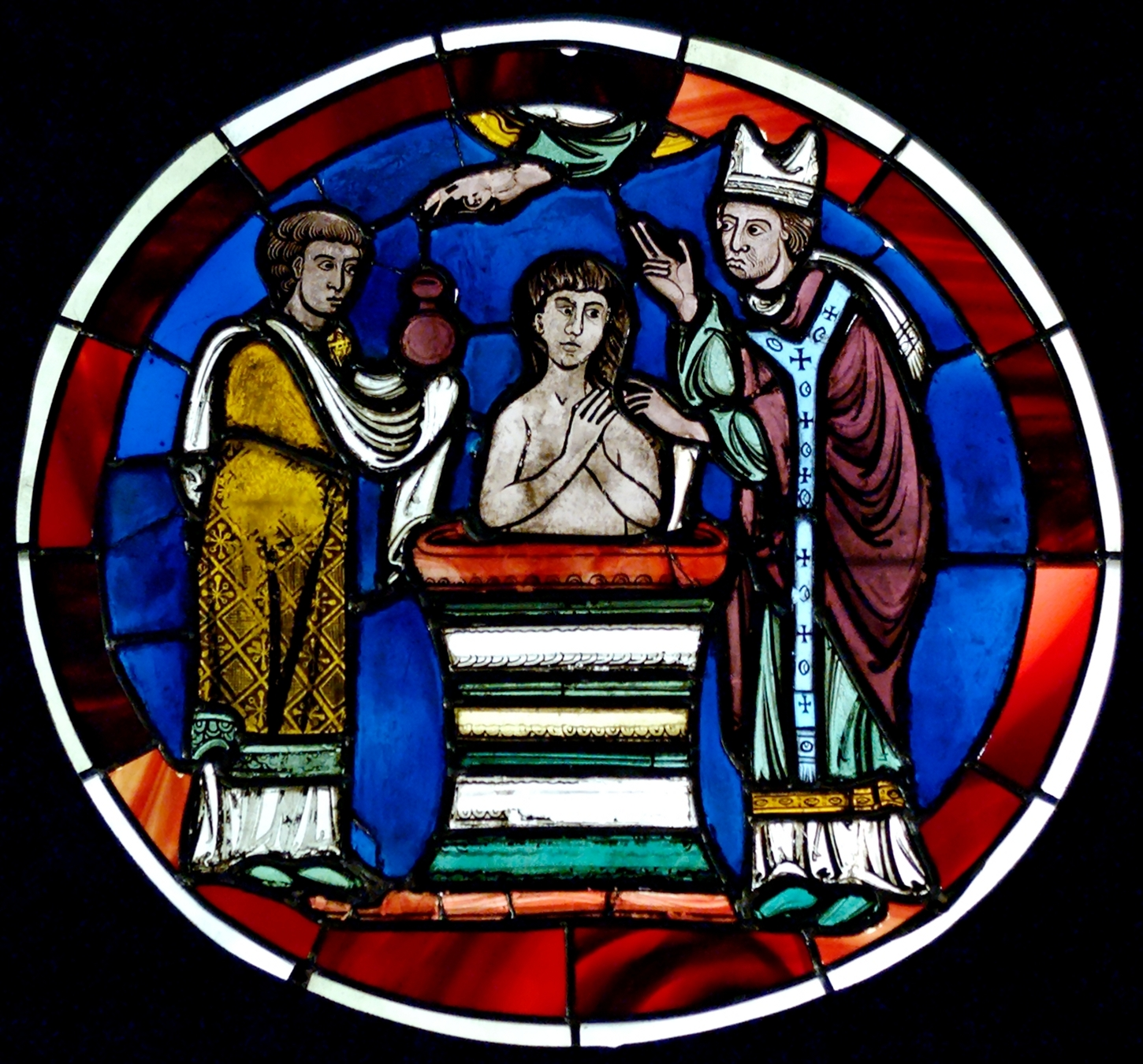
Glass of Sainte-Chapelle depicting a baptism (13th century), now in Cluny Museum

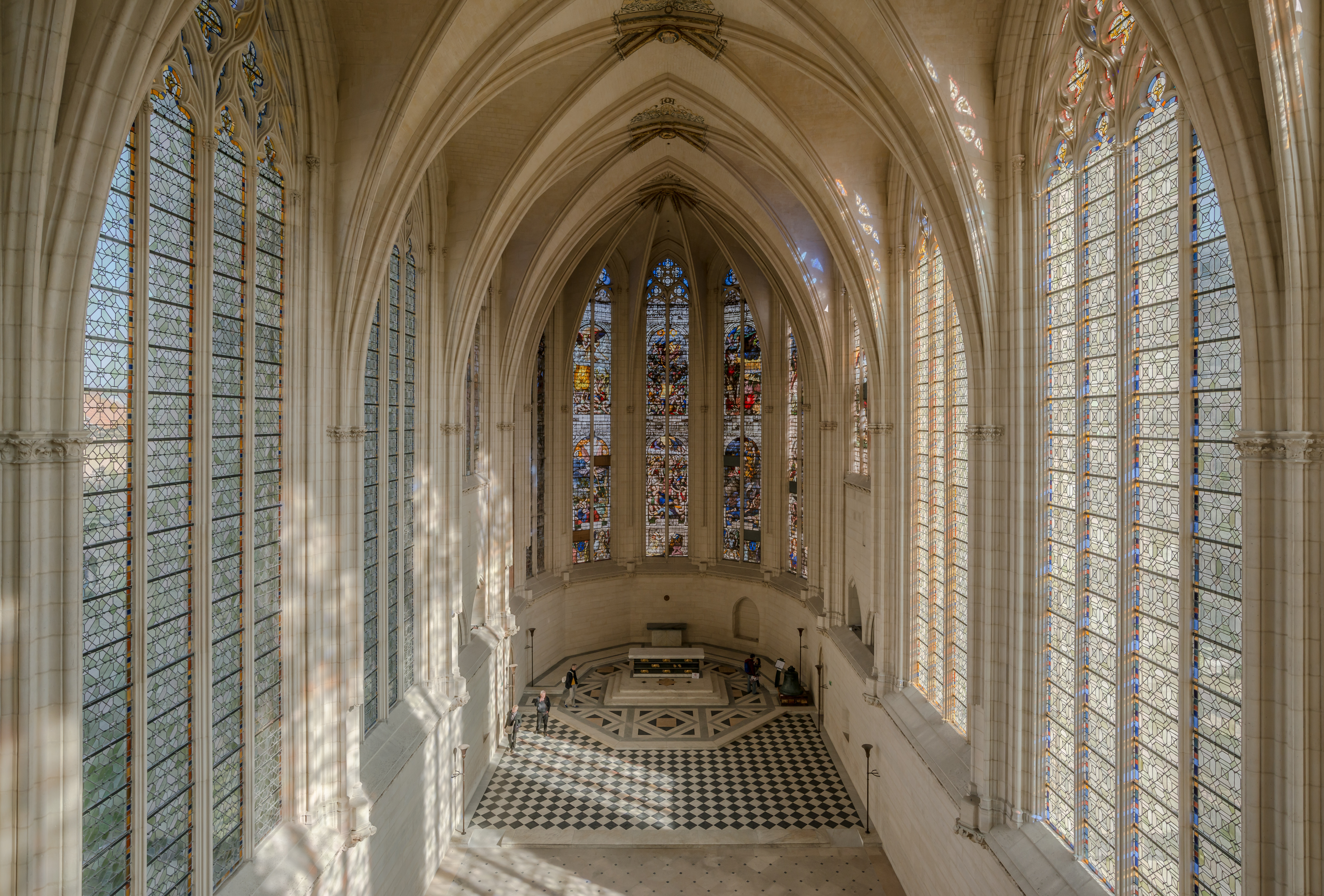
Sainte-Chapelle de Vincennes (14th century)

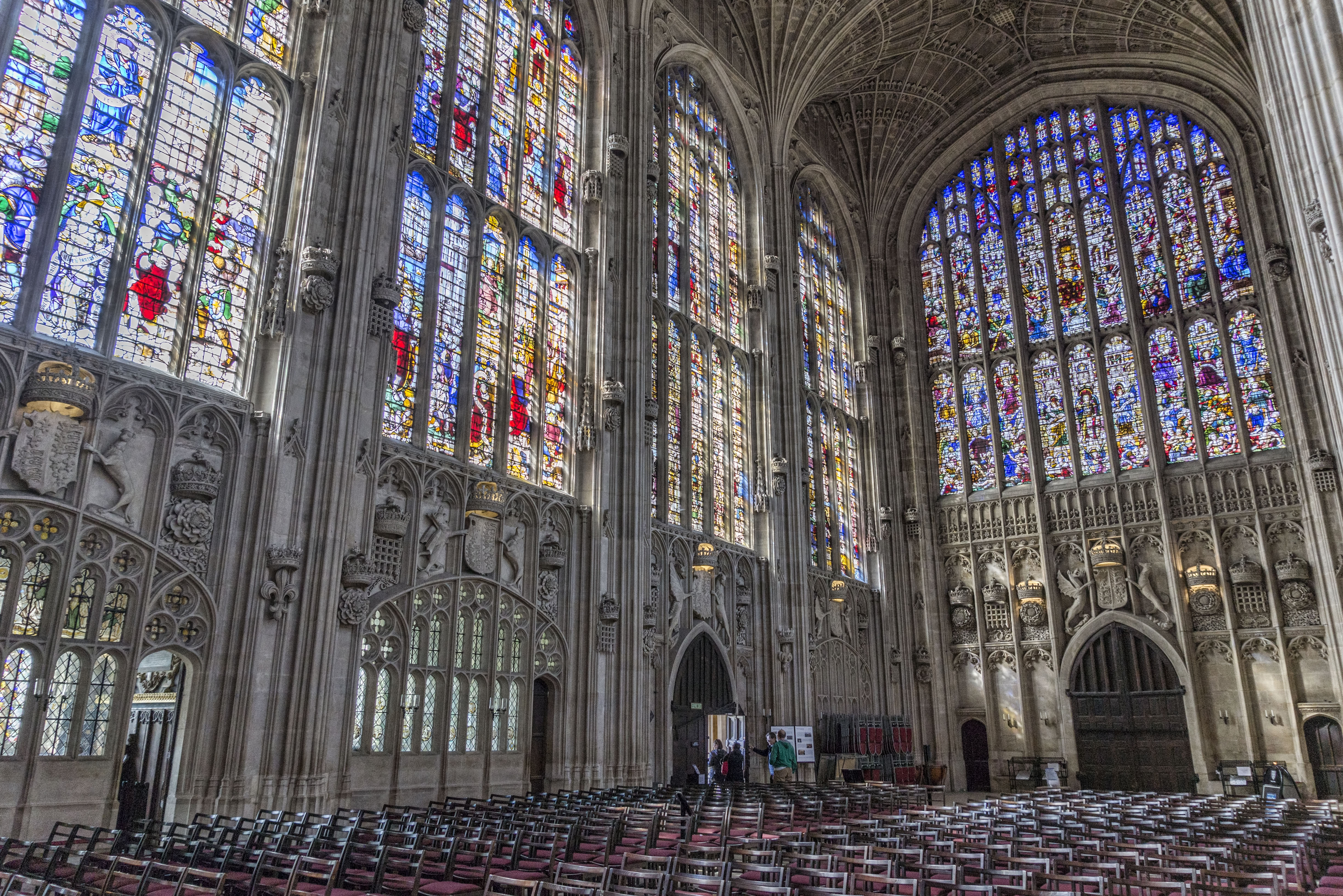
Windows of King's College Chapel, Cambridge (1446–1451)

The 13th century saw the introduction of a new kind of window, with grisaille, or white glass, with a geometric pattern, usually joined with medallions of stained glass. These windows allowed much more light into the cathedral, but diminished the vividness of the stained glass, since there was less contrast between the dark interior and bright exterior. The most remarkable and influential work of stained glass in the 13th century was the royal chapel, Sainte-Chapelle (1243–1248), where the windows of the upper chapel, 15 m (49 ft) high, occupied all of the walls on the three sides, with 1,134 individual scenes. Sainte-Chapelle became the model for other chapels across Europe.

The 14th century brought a variety of new colours, and the use of more realistic shading and half-toning. This was done by the development of flashed glass. Clear glass was dipped into coloured glass, then portions of the coloured glass were ground away to give exactly the right shade. In the 15th century, artists began painting directly onto the glass with enamel colours. Gradually the art of glass came closer and closer to traditional painting.

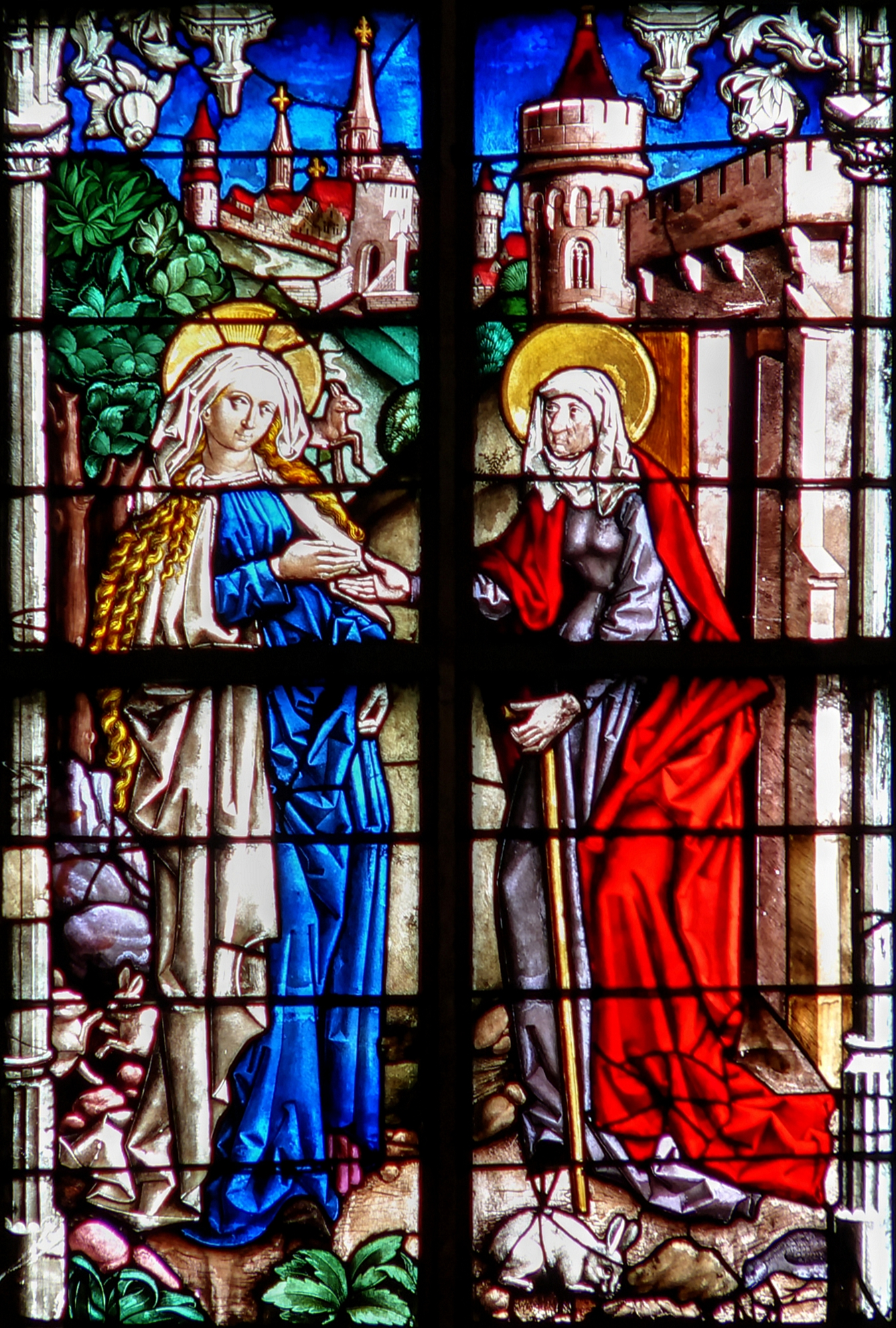
The Visitation window (1480) from Ulm Minster, by Peter Hemmel of Andlau. Late Gothic with fine shading and painted details.

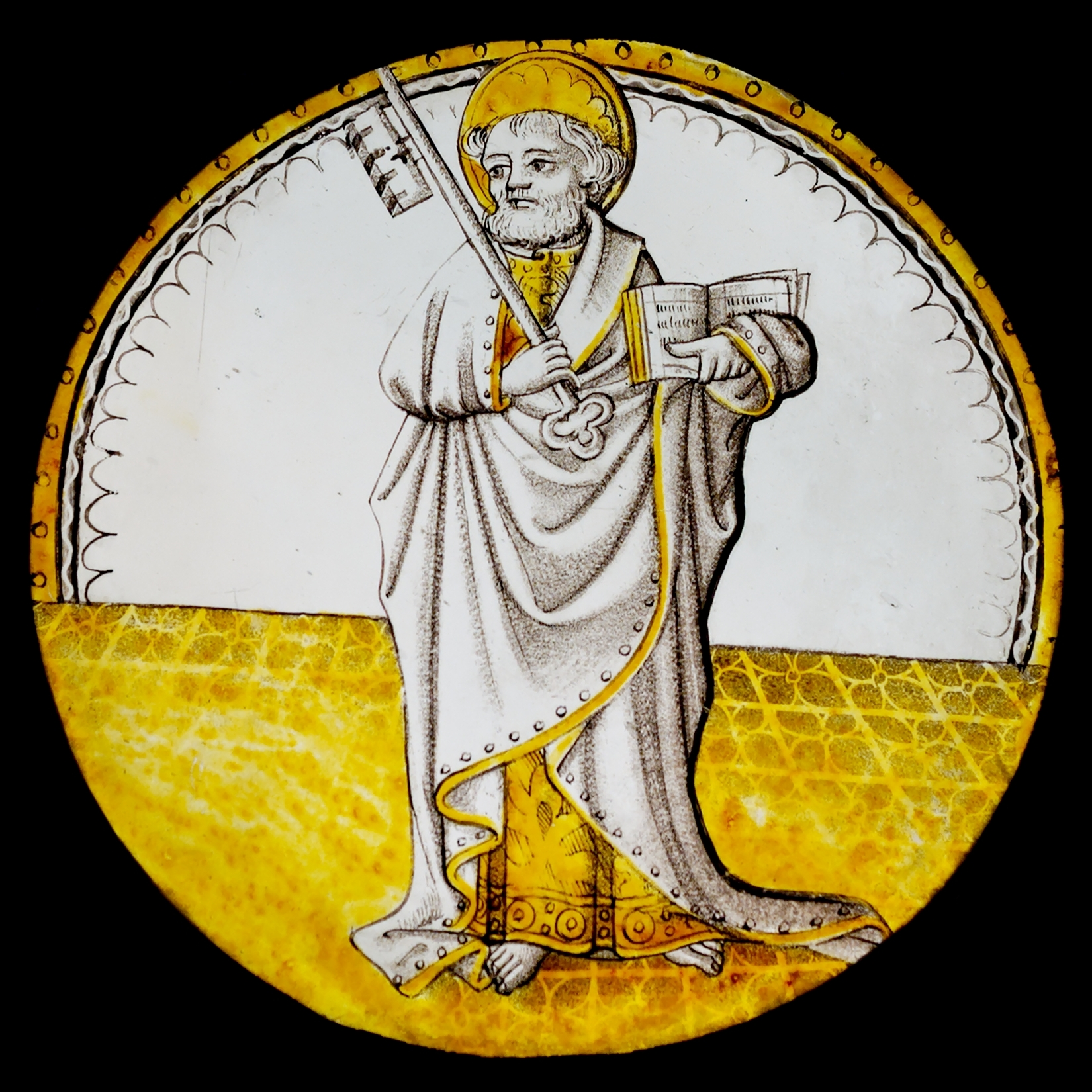
Late Gothic grisaille glass and painted figures, depicting Saint Nicholas (France, 1500–1510), Cluny Museum

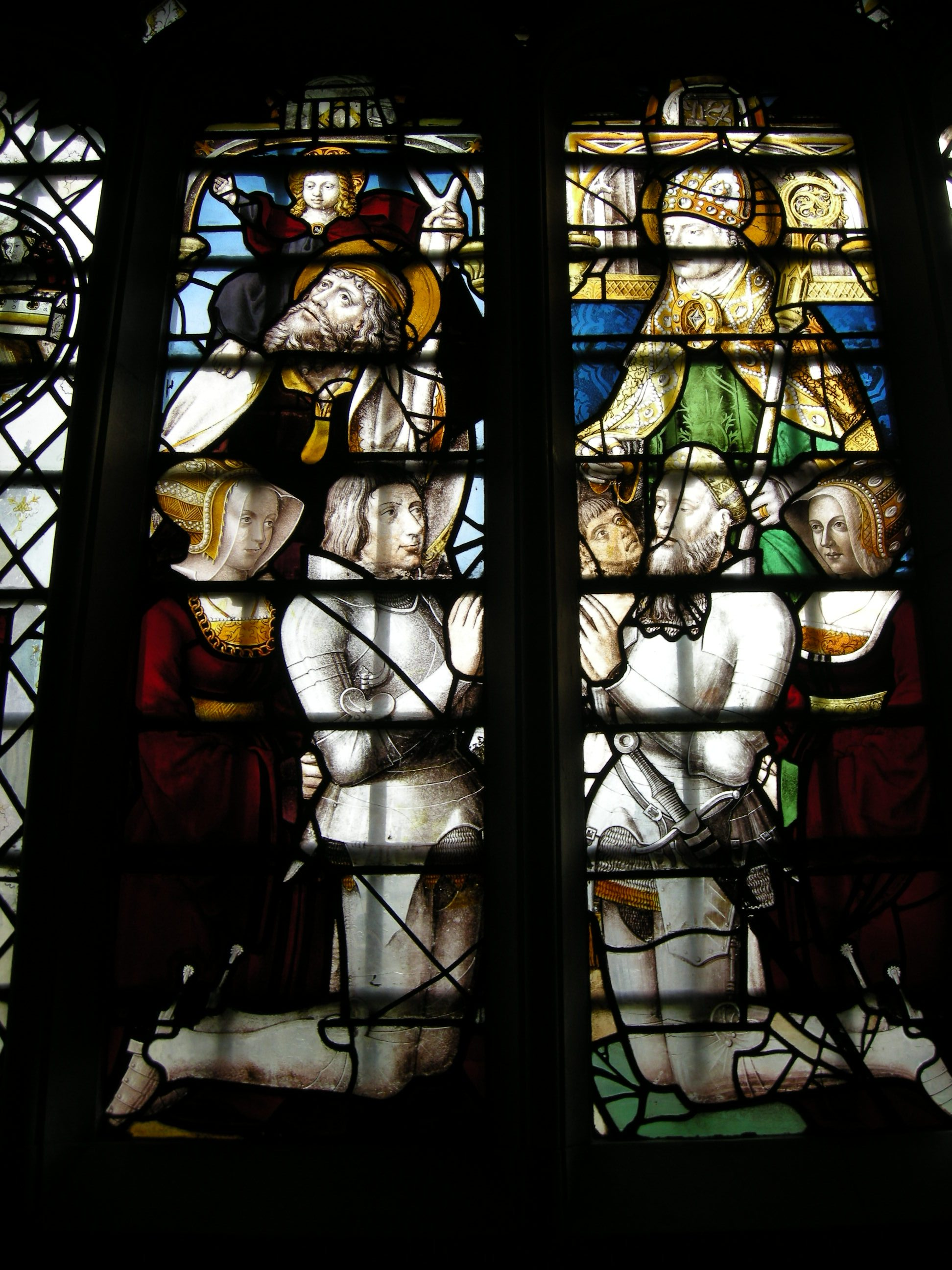
Detail of the Late Gothic stained glass of King's College Chapel, Cambridge, (1531)

One of the most celebrated Flamboyant buildings was the Sainte-Chapelle de Vincennes (1370s), with walls of glass from floor to ceiling. The original glass was destroyed, and is replaced by grisaille glass. King's College Chapel (15th century), also followed the model of walls entirely filled with glass.

The stained glass windows were extremely complex and expensive to create. King Louis IX paid for the rose windows in the transept of Notre-Dame de Paris, while other windows were often financed by the contributions of the professions or guilds of the city. These windows usually incorporated a panel which illustrates the work of the guild which funded it, such as the drapers, stonemasons, or barrel-makers.

In England, the stained glass windows also grew in size and importance; major examples were the Becket Windows at Canterbury Cathedral (1200–1230) and the windows of Lincoln Cathedral (1200–1220). Enormous windows were also an important element of York Minster and Gloucester Cathedral.

Much of the stained glass in Gothic churches today dates from later restorations, but a few, notably Chartres Cathedral and Bourges Cathedral, still have many of their original windows

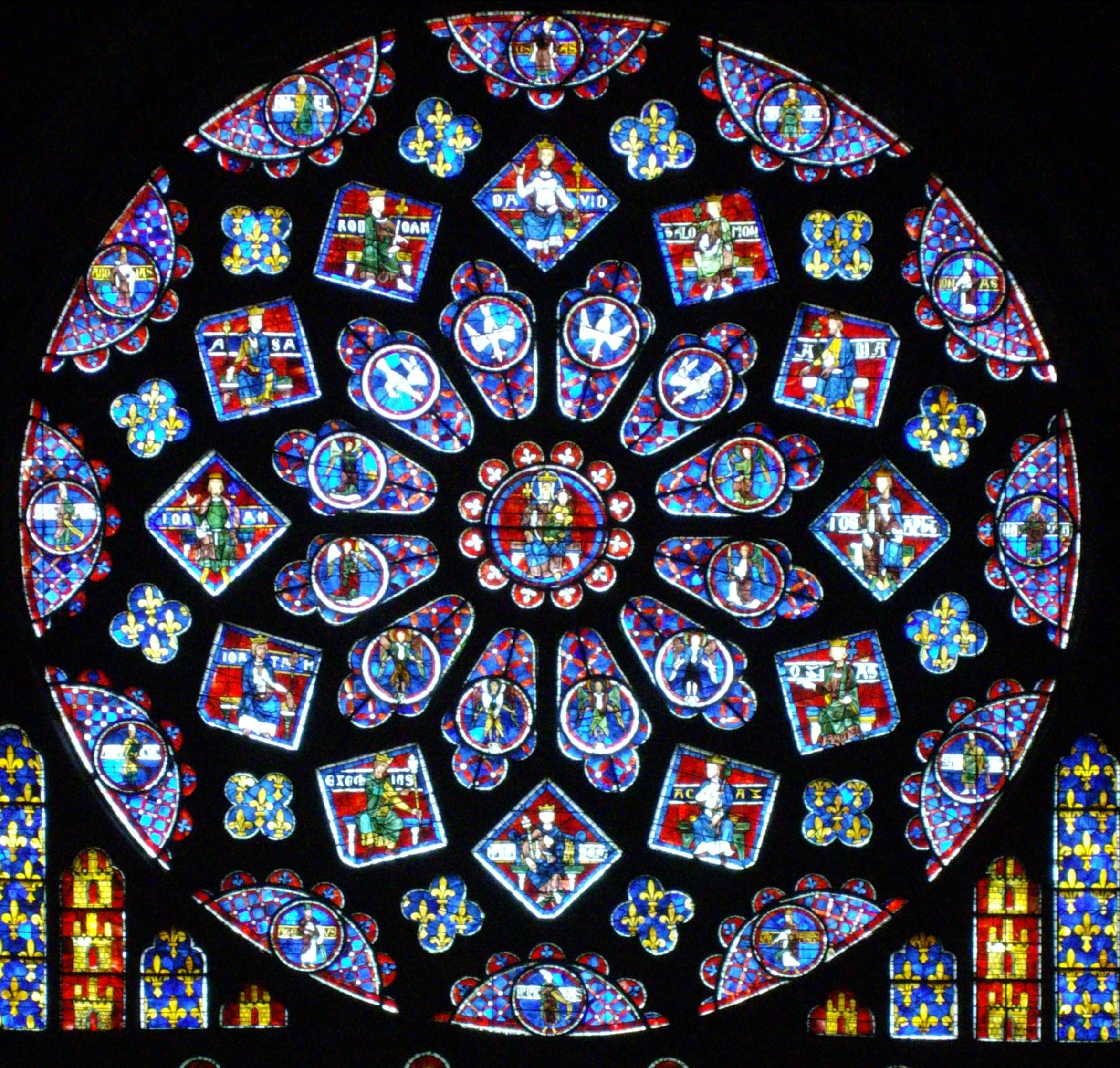
South rose window of Chartres Cathedral (13th century)

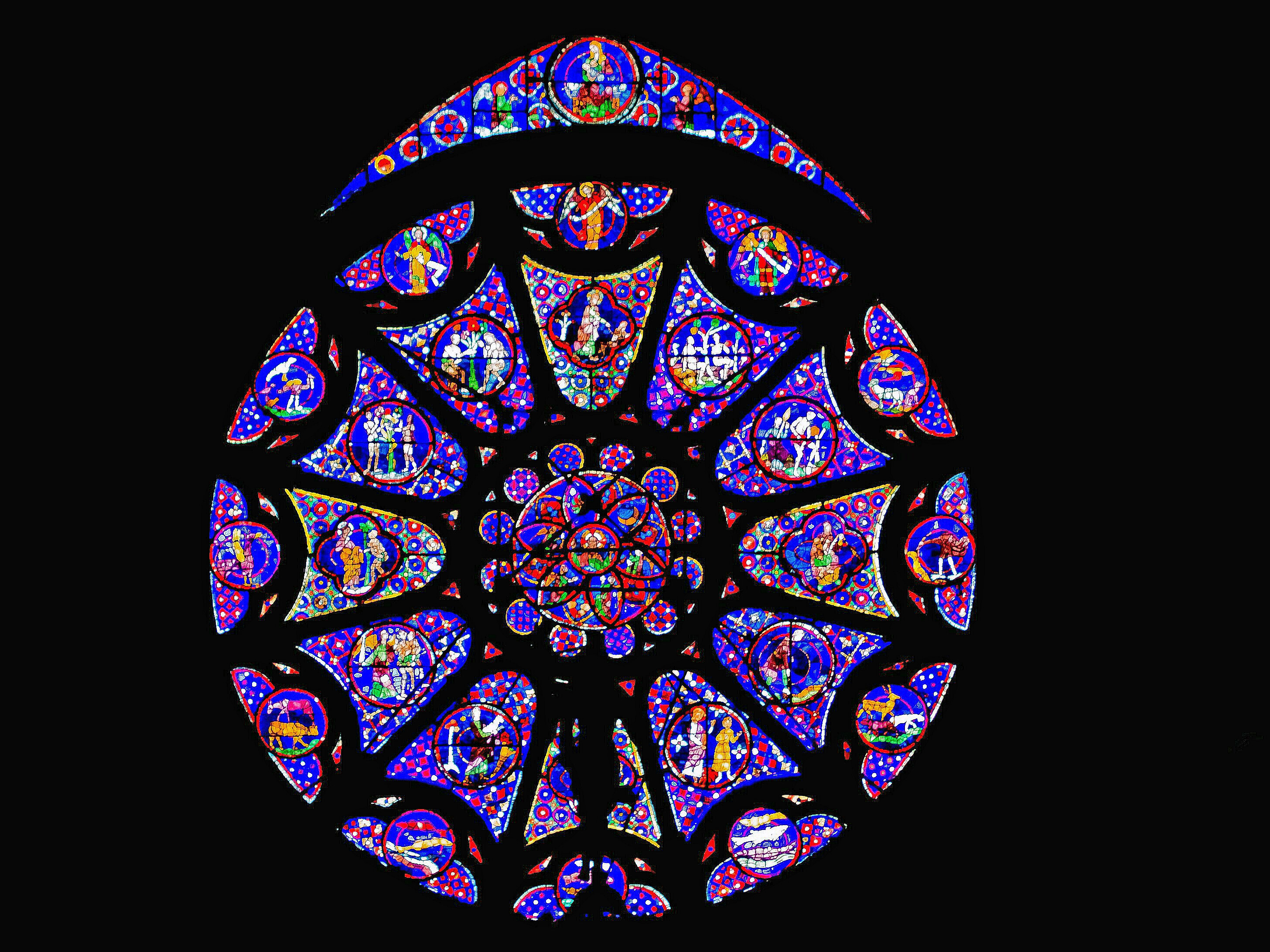
West rose window of Reims Cathedral (13th century)

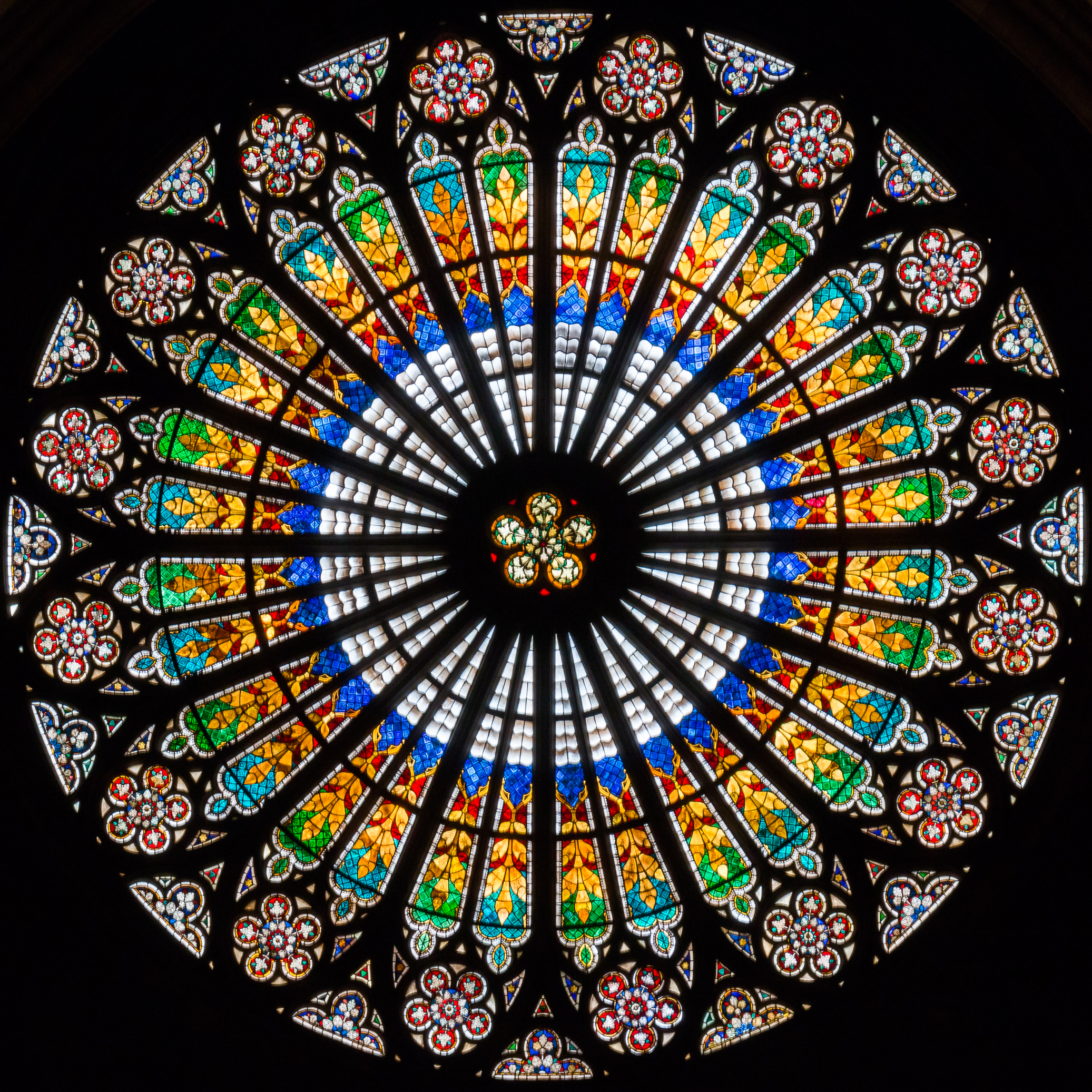
Grand rose of Strasbourg Cathedral (14th century)

=== Plans ===
Diagrammatic plan of a Gothic cathedral

The plan of Gothic cathedrals and churches was usually based on the Latin cross (or "cruciform") plan, taken from the ancient Roman Basilica, and from the later Romanesque churches. They have a long nave making the body of the church, where the parishioners worshipped; a transverse arm called the transept and, beyond it to the east, the choir, also known as a chancel or presbytery, that was usually reserved for the clergy. The eastern end of the church was rounded in French churches, and was occupied by several radiating chapels, which allowed multiple ceremonies to go on simultaneously. In English churches the eastern end also had chapels, but was usually rectangular. A passage called the ambulatory circled the choir. This allowed pilgrims, to access relics displayed in the chevet chapels without disturbing other services going on.

Each vault of the nave formed a separate cell, with its own supporting piers or columns. The early cathedrals, like Notre-Dame, had six-part rib vaults, with alternating columns and piers, while later cathedrals had the simpler and stronger four-part vaults, with identical columns.

Following the model of Romanesque architecture and the Basilica of Saint Denis, cathedrals usually had two towers flanking the west façade. Towers over the crossing were common in England (Salisbury Cathedral, York Minister) but rarer in France.

Transepts were usually short in early French Gothic architecture, but became longer and were given large rose windows in the Rayonnant period. The choirs became more important. The choir was often flanked by a double disambulatory, which was crowned by a ring of small chapels. In England, transepts were more important, and the floor plans were usually much more complex than in French cathedrals, with the addition of attached Lady Chapels, an octagonal Chapter House, and other structures (See plans of Salisbury Cathedral and York Minster below). This reflected a tendency in France to carry out multiple functions in the same space, while English cathedrals compartmentalized them. This contrast is visible in the difference between Amiens Cathedral, with its minimal transepts and semicircular apse, filled with chapels, on the east end, compared with the double transepts, projecting north porch, and rectangular east end of Salisbury and York.

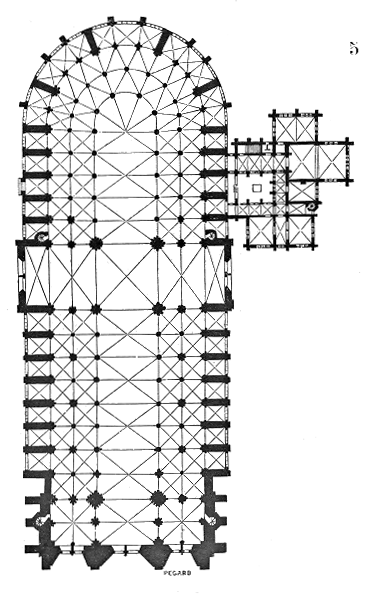
Notre Dame de Paris, France, length 128 m.

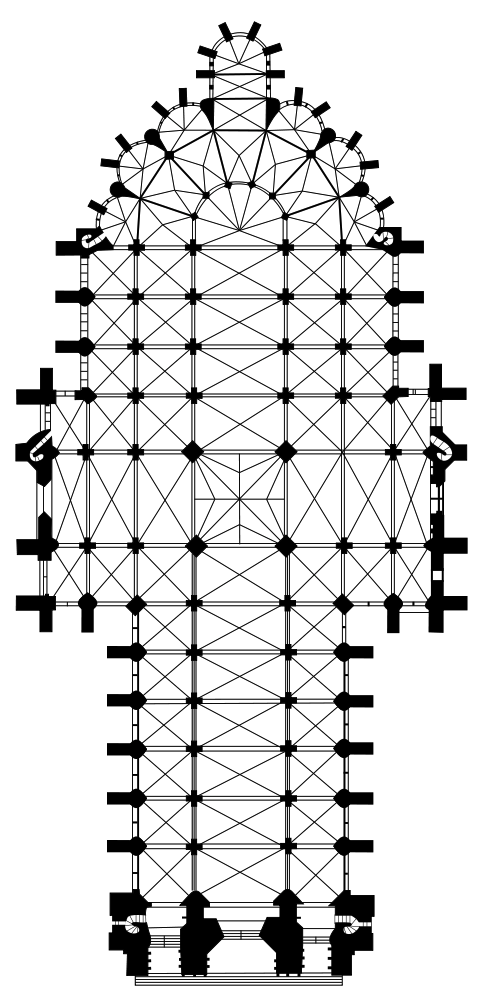
Amiens Cathedral, France, length 145 m.

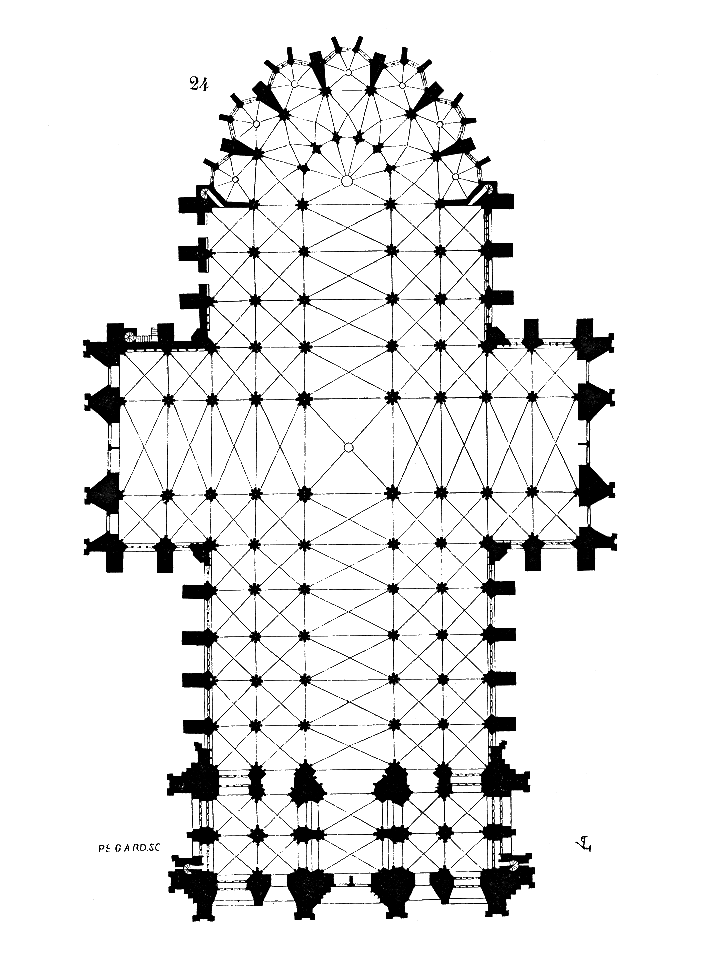
Cologne Cathedral, Germany, length 144 m, Its plan was modeled after Amiens Cathedral, but widened

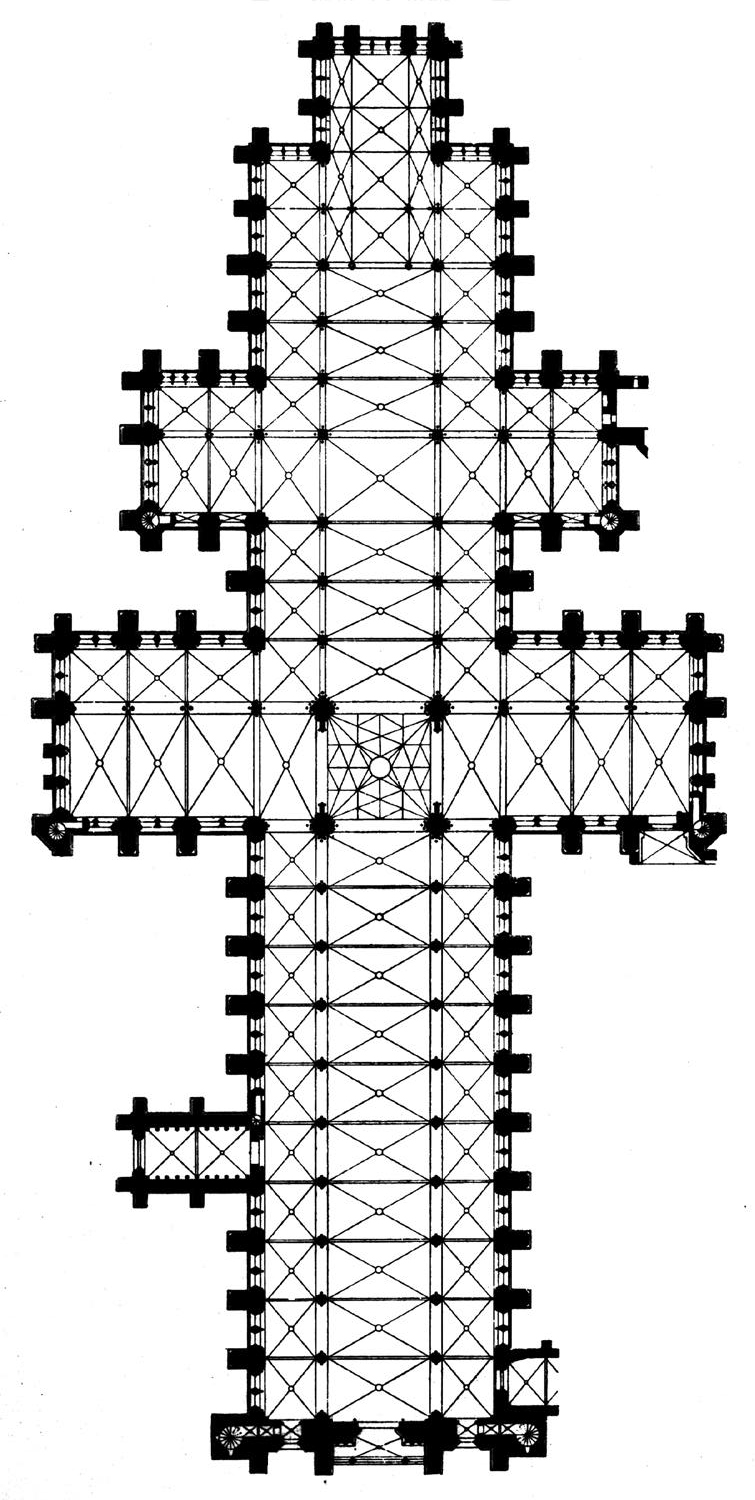
Salisbury Cathedral, England, length 135 m, with a central tower over the crossing

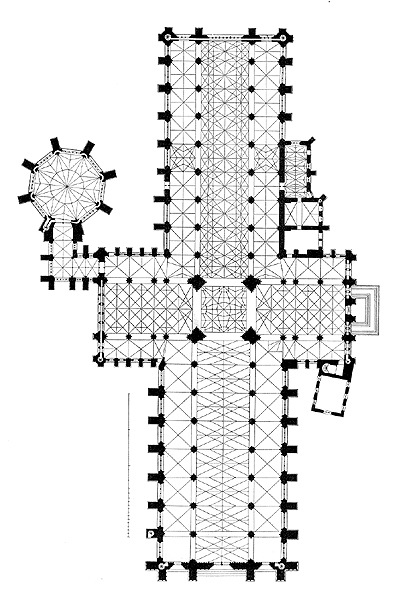
York Minster, England, length 159 m, with its attached octagonal Chapter House

==== East end ====
Cathedrals and churches were traditionally constructed with the altar at the east end, so that the priest and congregation faced the rising sun during the morning liturgy. The sun was considered the symbol of Christ and the Second Coming, a major theme in Cathedral sculpture. The portion of the church east of altar is the choir, reserved for members of the clergy. There is usually a single or double ambulatory, or aisle, around the choir and east end, so parishioners and pilgrims could walk freely easily around east end.

In Romanesque churches, the east end was very dark, due to the thick walls and small windows. In the ambulatory of the Basilica of Saint Denis, Abbot Suger first used the novel combination rib vaults and buttresses to replace the thick walls and replace them with stained glass, opening up that portion of the church to what he considered "divine light".

In French Gothic churches, the east end, or chevet, often had an apse, a semi-circular projection with a vaulted or domed roof. The chevet of large cathedrals frequently had a ring of radiating chapels, placed between the buttresses to get maximum light. There are three such chapels at Chartres Cathedral, seven at Notre Dame de Paris, Amiens Cathedral, Prague Cathedral and Cologne Cathedral, and nine at Basilica of Saint Anthony of Padua in Italy. In England, the east end is more often rectangular, and gives access to a separate and large Lady Chapel, dedicated to the Virgin Mary. Lady Chapels were also common in Italy.

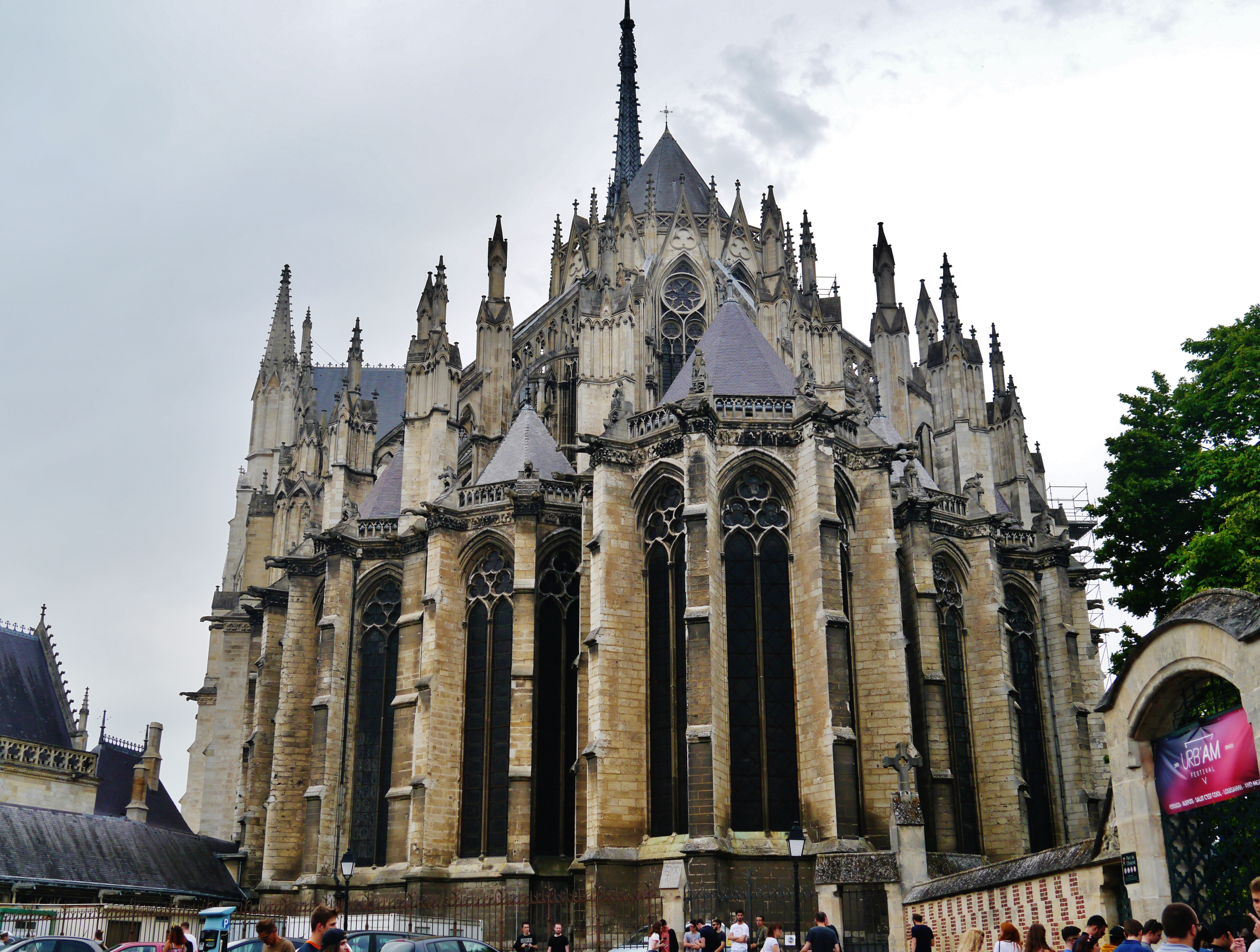
High Gothic Chevet of Amiens Cathedral, with chapels between the buttresses (13th century)

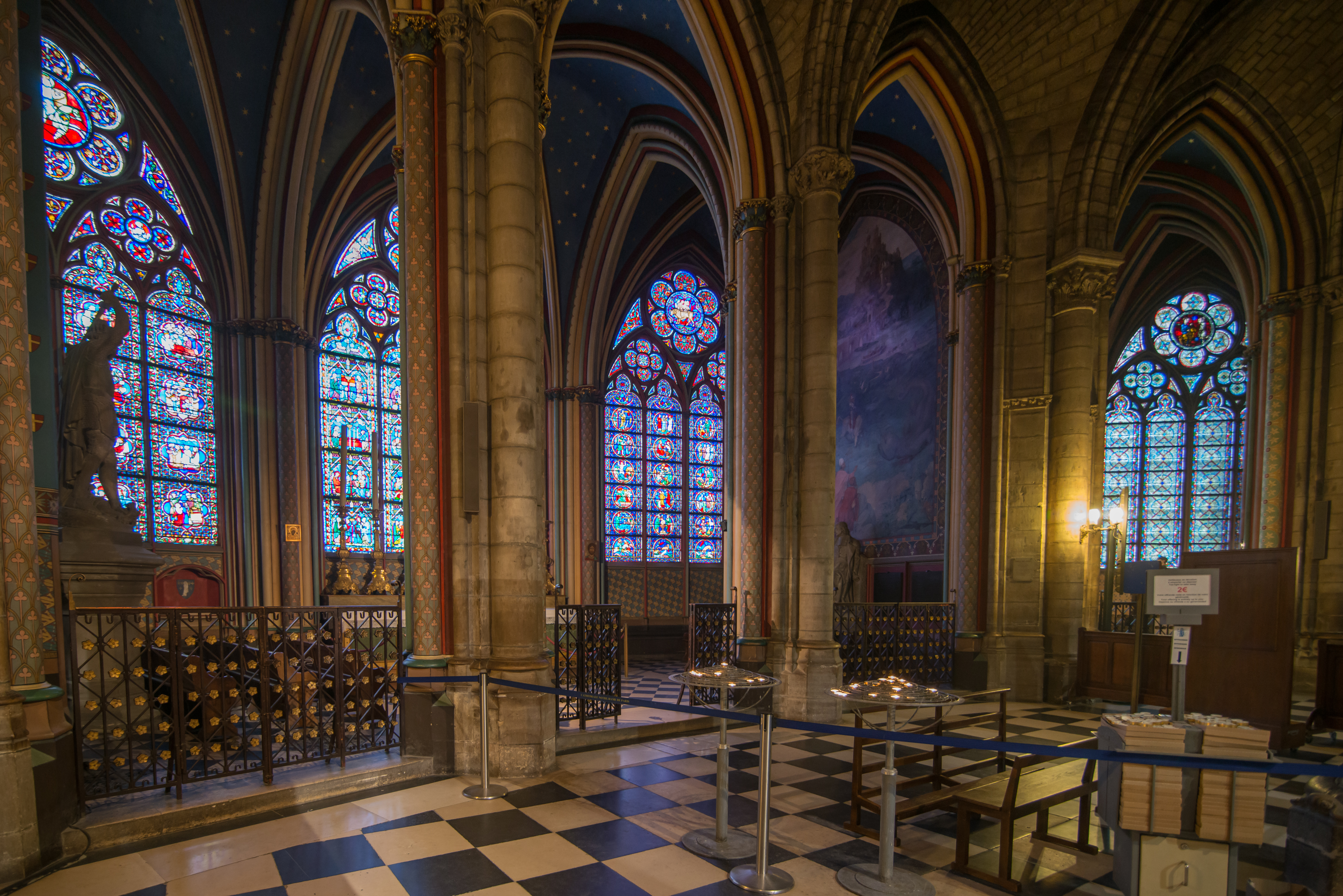
Ambulatory and Chapels of the chevet of Notre Dame de Paris (14th century)

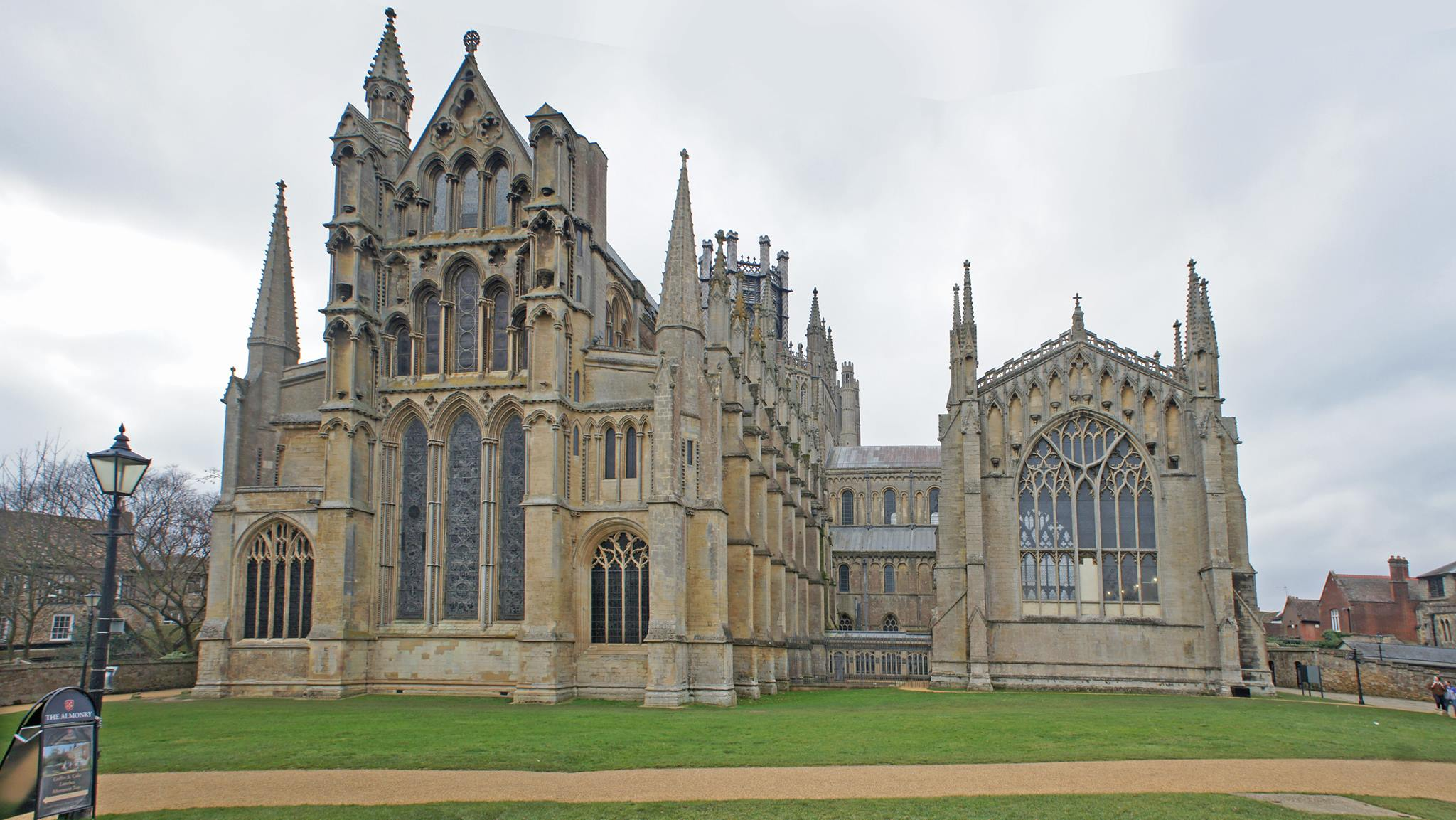
Ely Cathedral – square east end: Early English presbytery (left) and Decorated Lady Chapel (right)

=== Elevations and the search for height ===
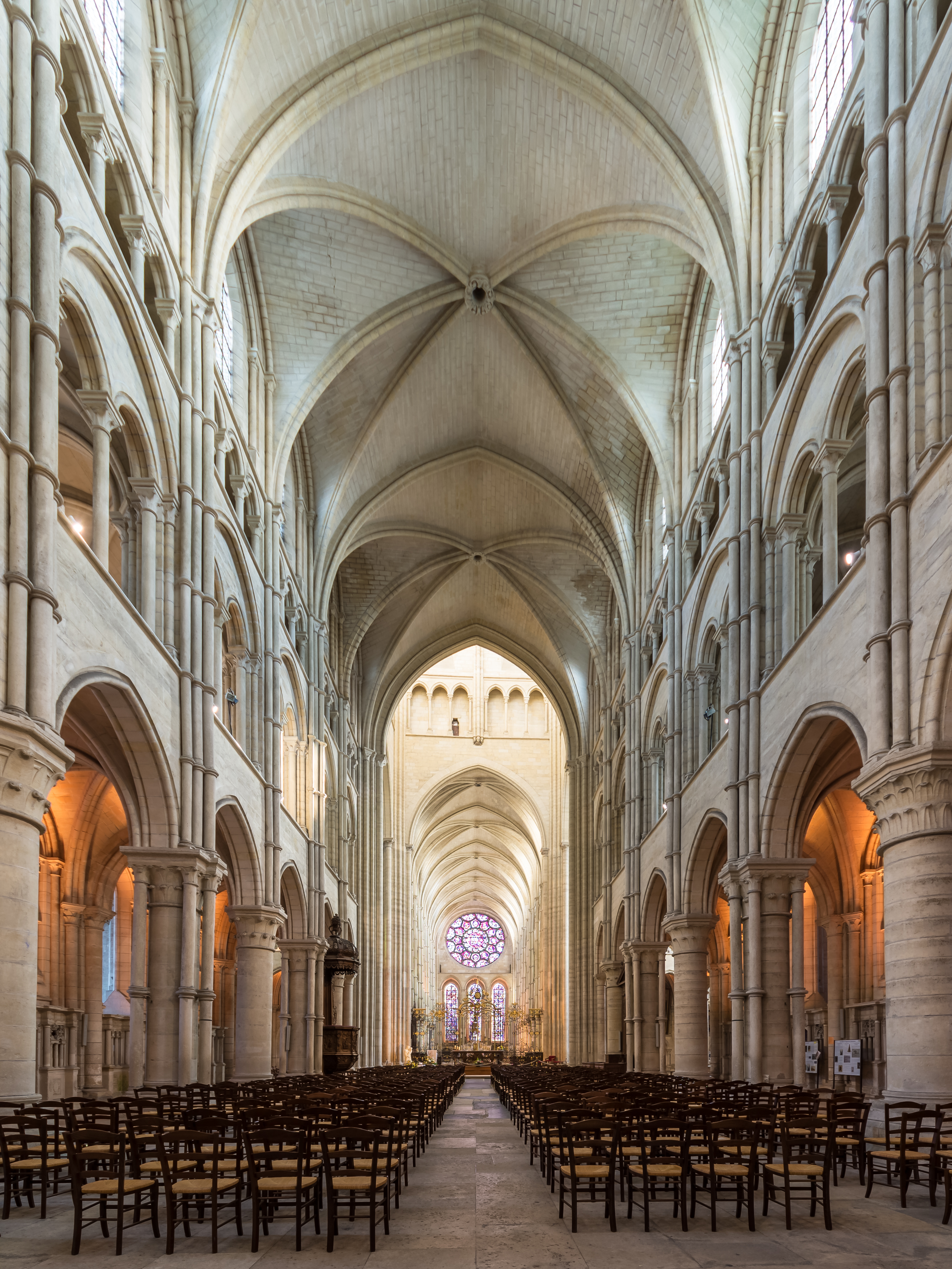
Early Gothic Laon Cathedral (1150s–1230)

Gothic architecture was a continual search for greater height, thinner walls, and more light. This was clearly illustrated in the evolving elevations of the cathedrals.

In Early Gothic architecture, following the model of the Romanesque churches, the buildings had thick, solid walls with a minimum of windows in order to give enough support for the vaulted roofs. An elevation typically had four levels. On the ground floor was an arcade with massive piers alternating with thinner columns, which supported the six-part rib vaults. Above that was a gallery, called the tribune, which provided stability to the walls, and was sometimes used to provide seating for the nuns. Above that was a narrower gallery, called the triforium, which also helped provide additional thickness and support. At the top, just beneath the vaults, was the clerestory, where the high windows were placed. The upper level was supported from the outside by the flying buttresses. This system was used at Noyon Cathedral, Sens Cathedral, and other early structures.

In the High Gothic period, thanks to the introduction of the four part rib vault, a simplified elevation appeared at Chartres Cathedral and others. The alternating piers and columns on the ground floor were replaced by rows of identical circular piers wrapped in four engaged columns. The tribune disappeared, which meant that the arcades could be higher. This created more space at the top for the upper windows, which were expanded to include a smaller circular window above a group of lancet windows. The new walls gave a stronger sense of verticality and brought in more light. A similar arrangement was adapted in England, at Salisbury Cathedral, Lincoln Cathedral, and Ely Cathedral.

An important characteristic of Gothic church architecture is its height, both absolute and in proportion to its width, the verticality suggesting an aspiration to Heaven. The increasing height of cathedrals over the Gothic period was accompanied by an increasing proportion of the wall devoted to windows, until, by the late Gothic, the interiors became like cages of glass. This was made possible by the development of the flying buttress, which transferred the thrust of the weight of the roof to the supports outside the walls. As a result, the walls gradually became thinner and higher, and masonry was replaced with glass. The four-part elevation of the naves of early Cathedrals such as Notre-Dame (arcade, tribune, triforium, clerestory) was transformed in the choir of Beauvais Cathedral to very tall arcades, a thin triforium, and soaring windows up to the roof.

Beauvais Cathedral reached the limit of what was possible with Gothic technology. A portion of the choir collapsed in 1284, causing alarm in all of the cities with very tall cathedrals. Panels of experts were created in Sienna and Chartres to study the stability of those structures. Only the transept and choir of Beauvais were completed, and in the 21st century, the transept walls were reinforced with cross-beams. No cathedral built since exceeded the height of the choir of Beauvais.

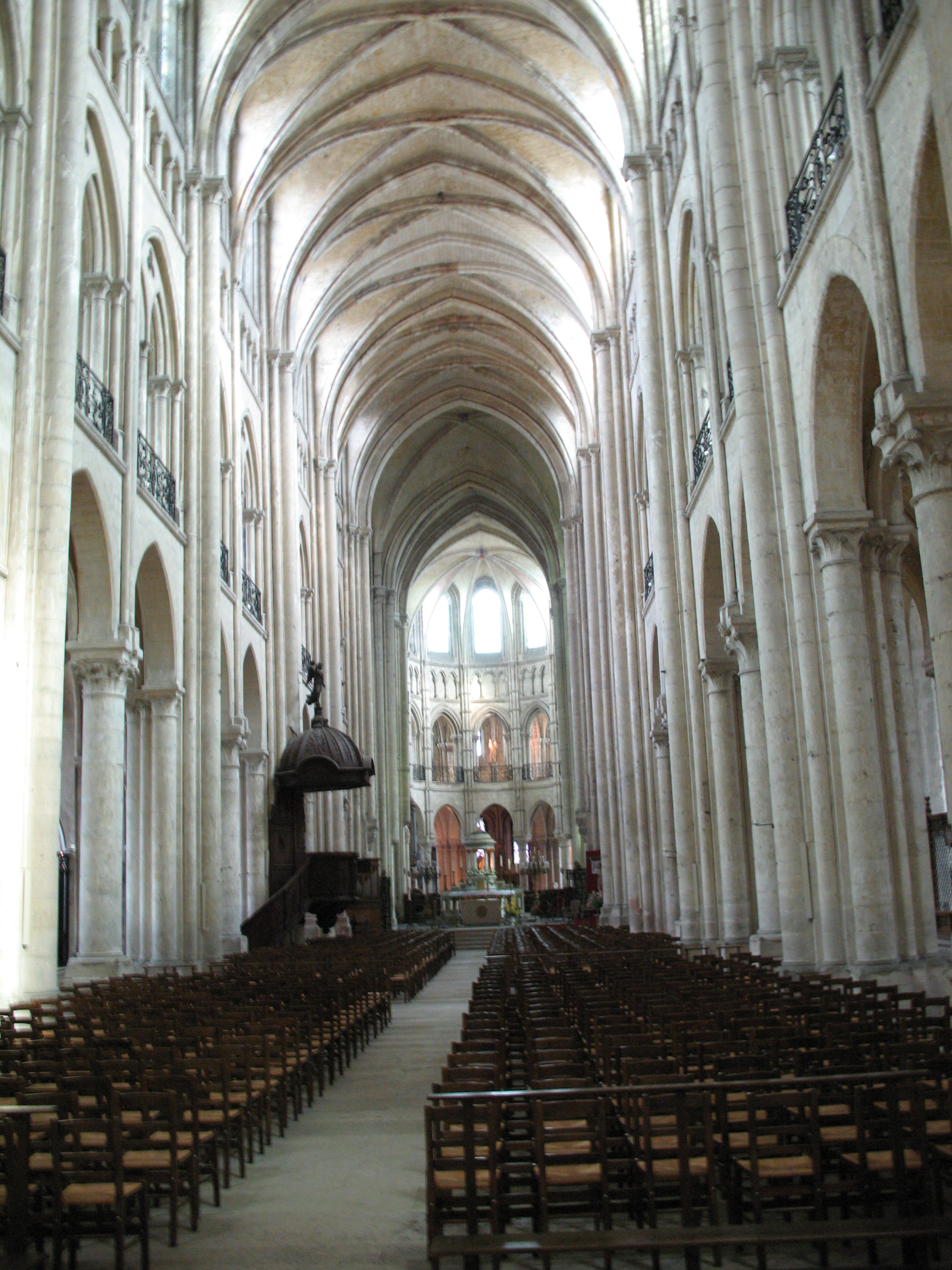
Noyon Cathedral nave showing the four early Gothic levels (late 12h century)

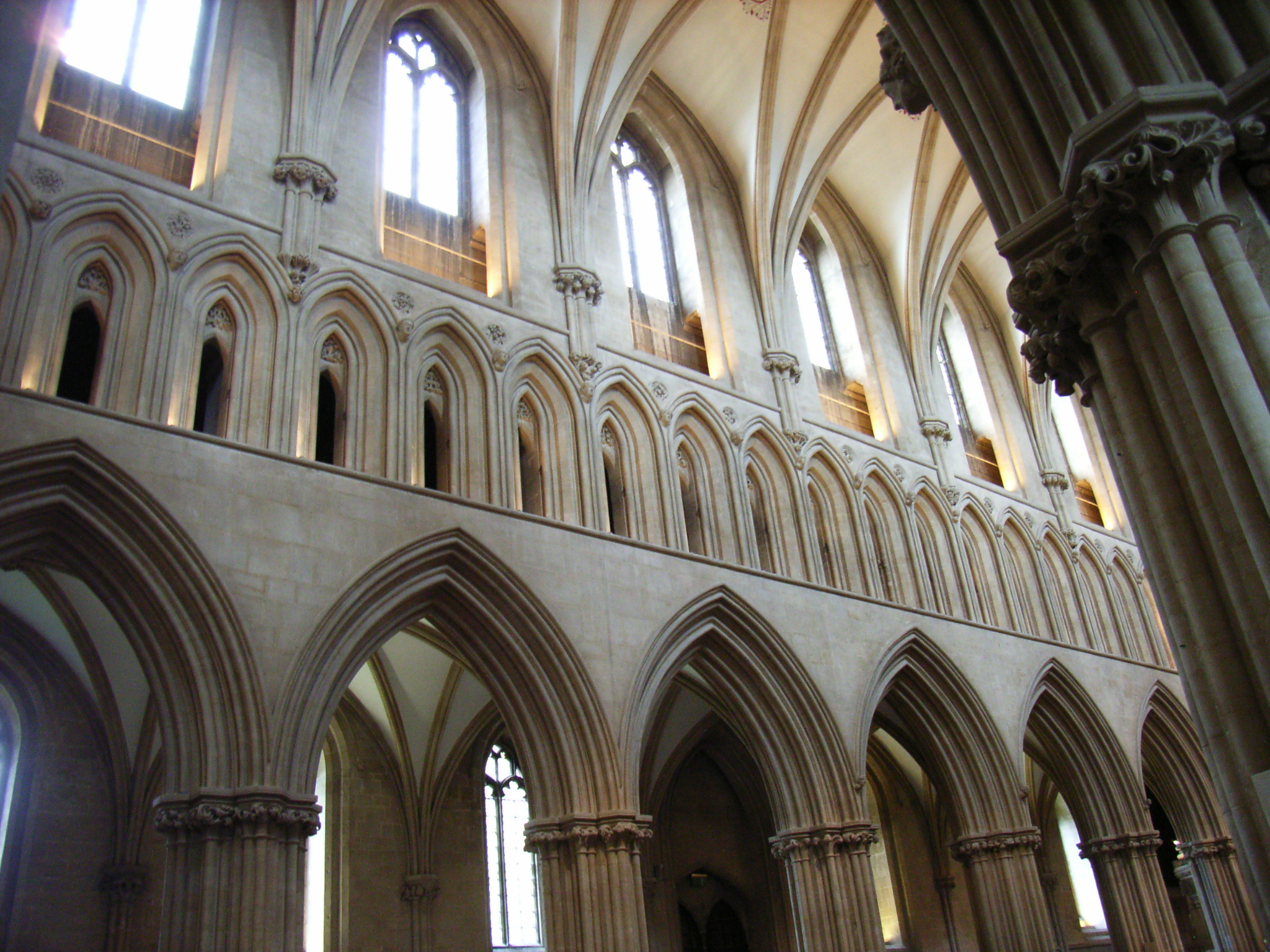
Three-part elevation of Wells Cathedral (begun 1176)

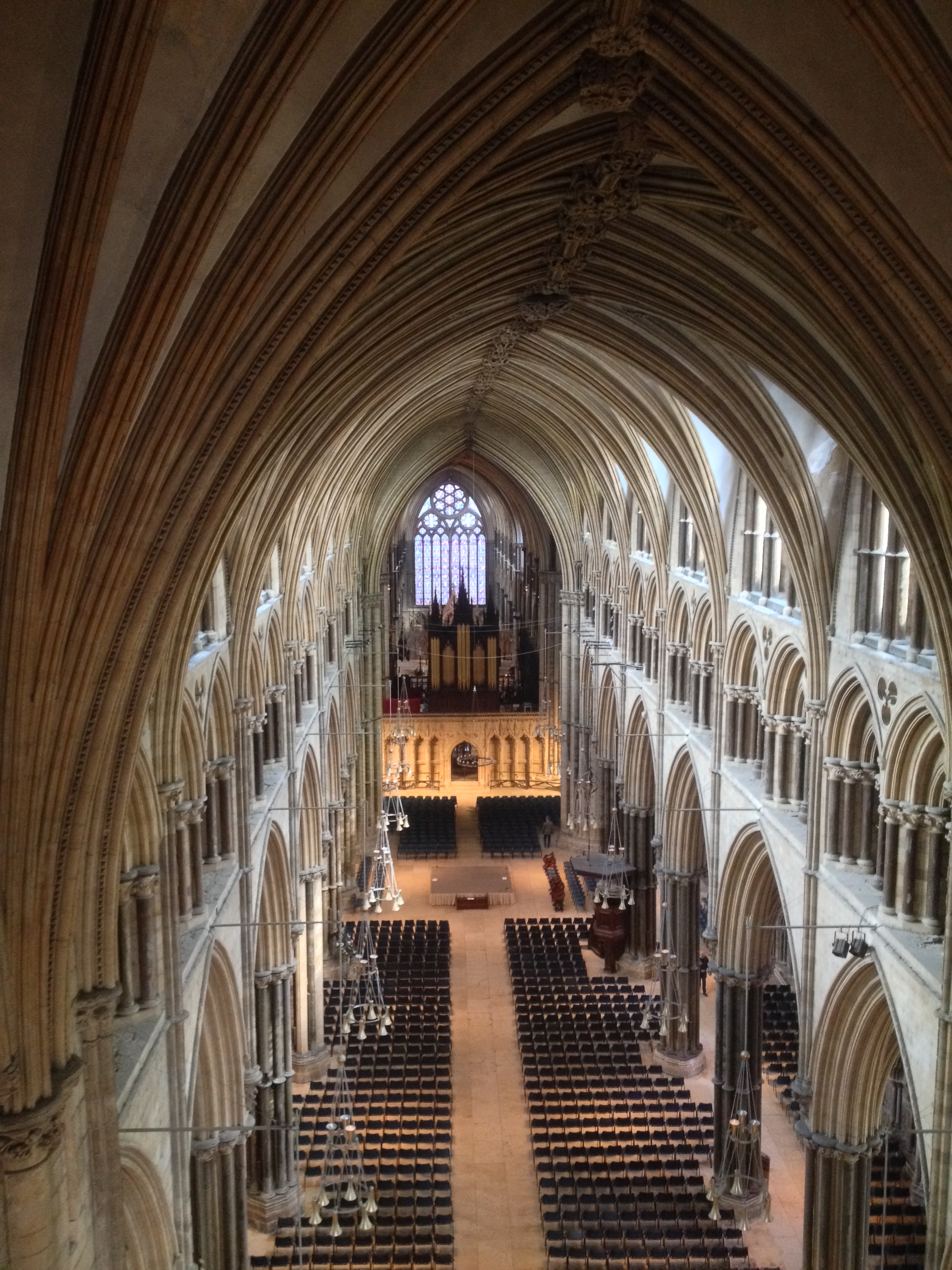
Nave of Lincoln Cathedral (begun 1185) showing three levels; arcade (bottom); tribune (middle) and clerestory (top)

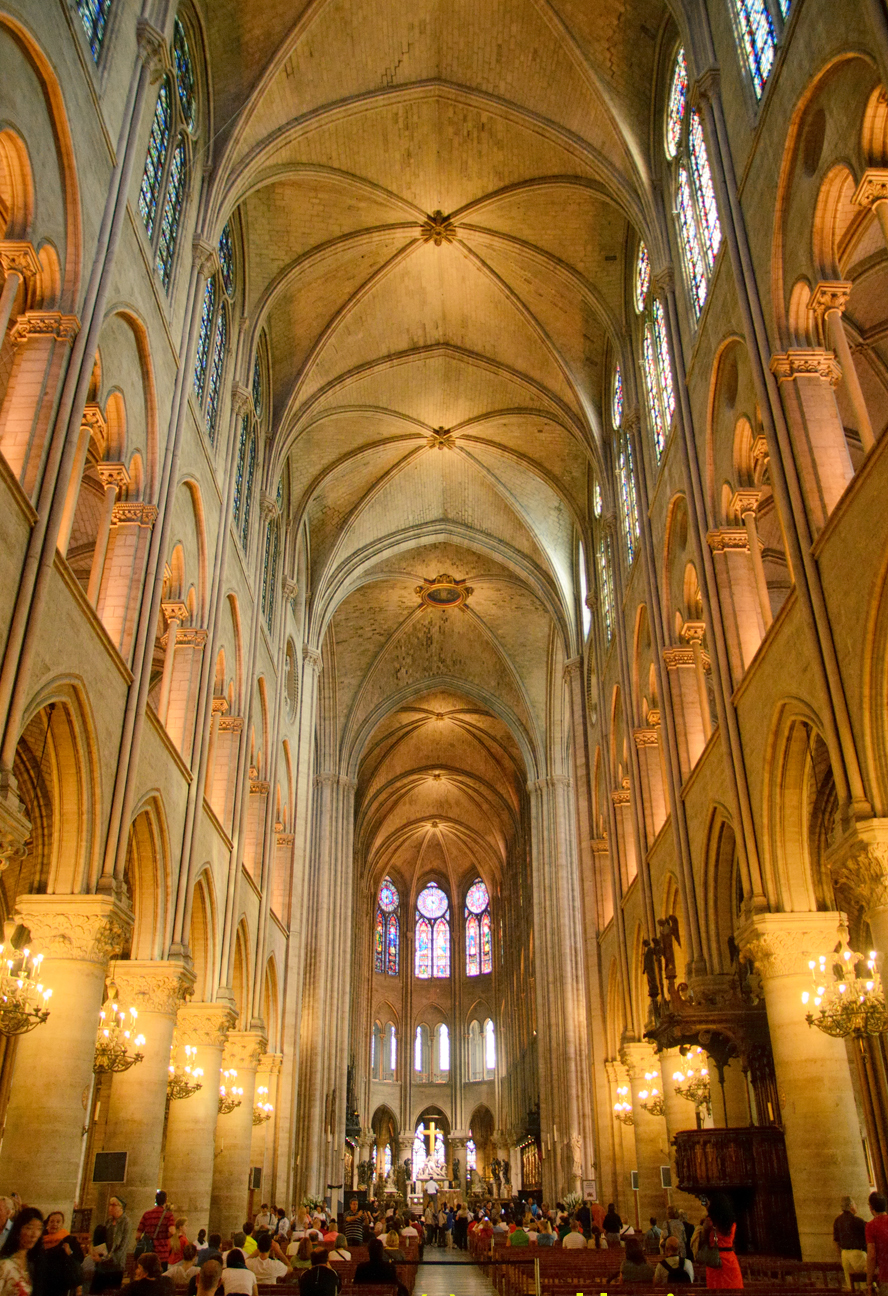
Notre-Dame de Paris nave (rebuilt 1180–1220)

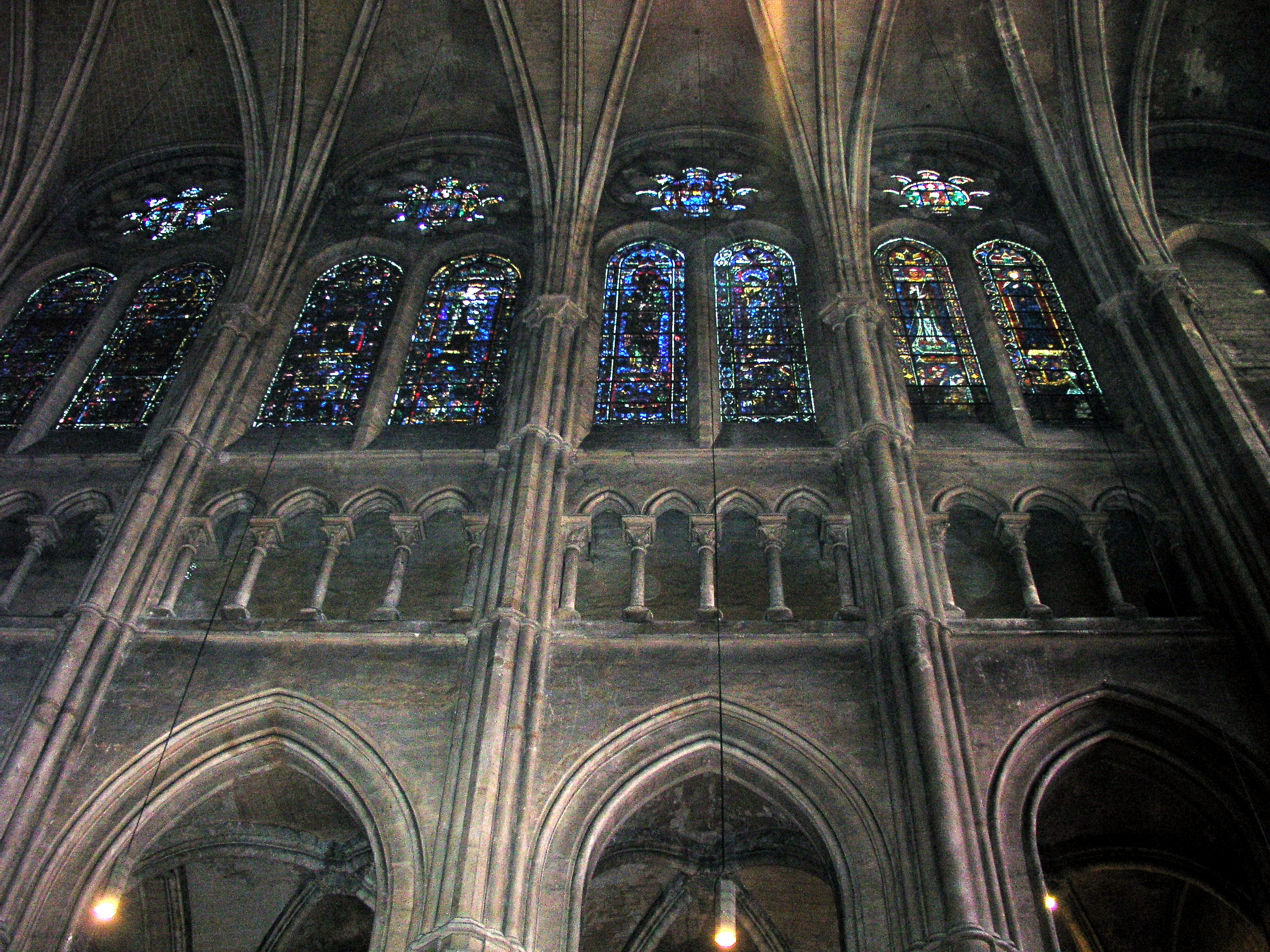
Three-part elevation of Chartres Cathedral, with larger clerestory windows

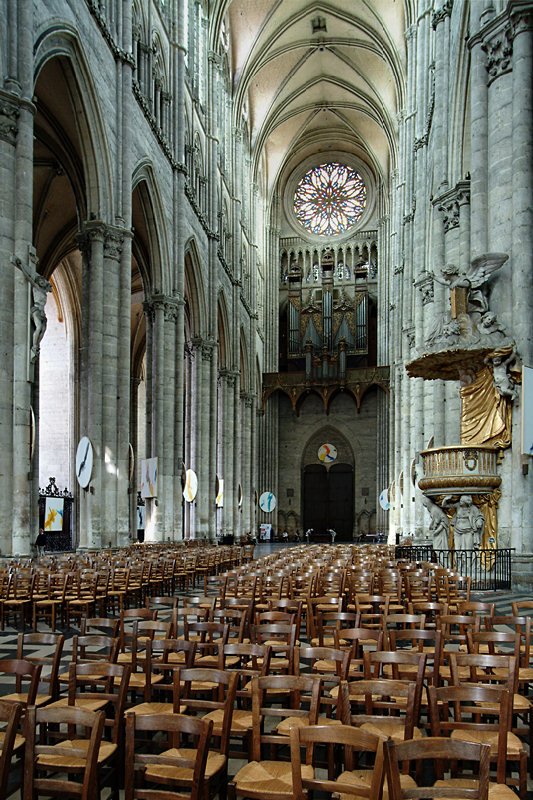
Nave of Amiens Cathedral, looking west (1220–1270)

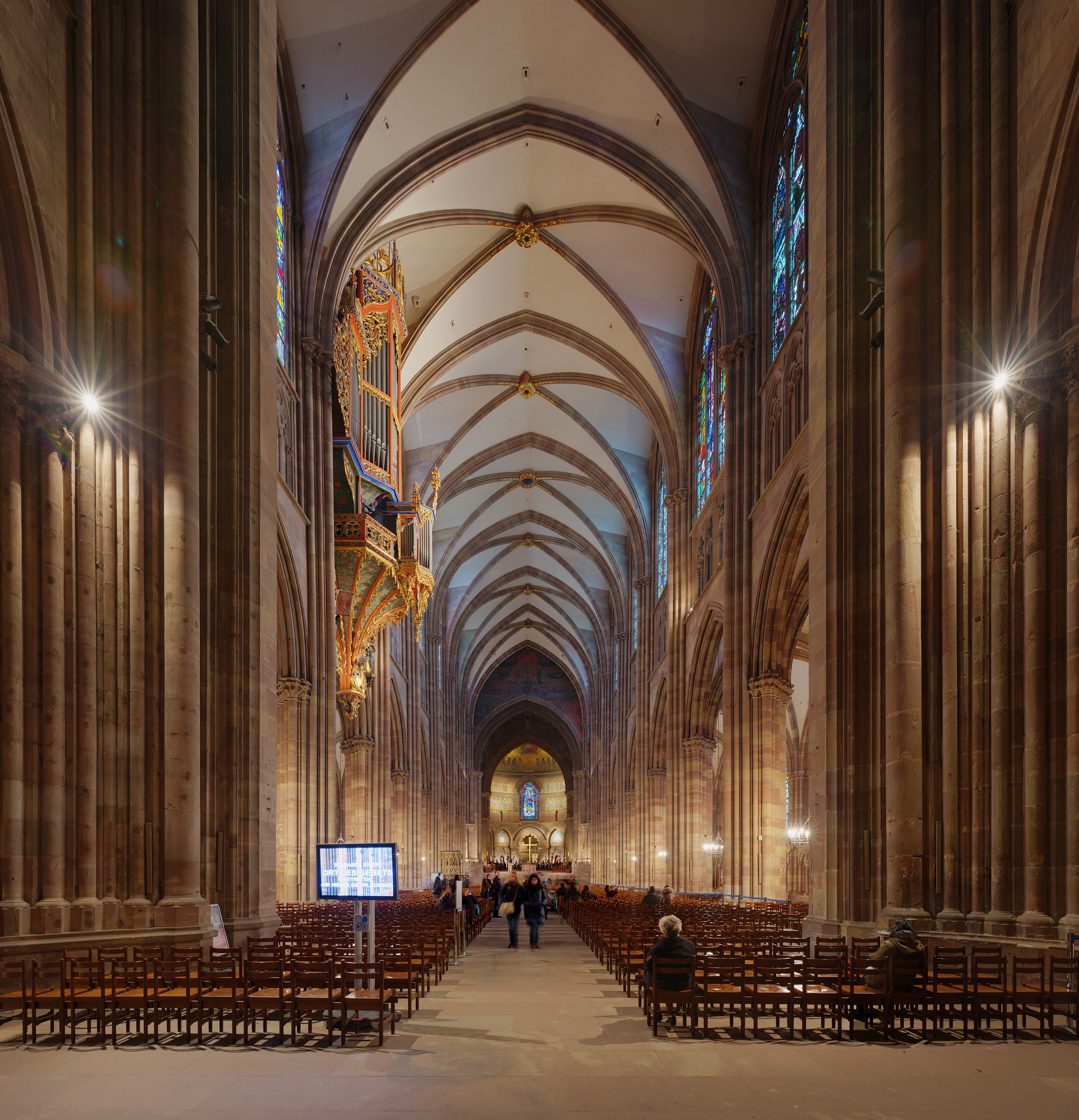
Nave of Strasbourg Cathedral (mid-13th century), looking east

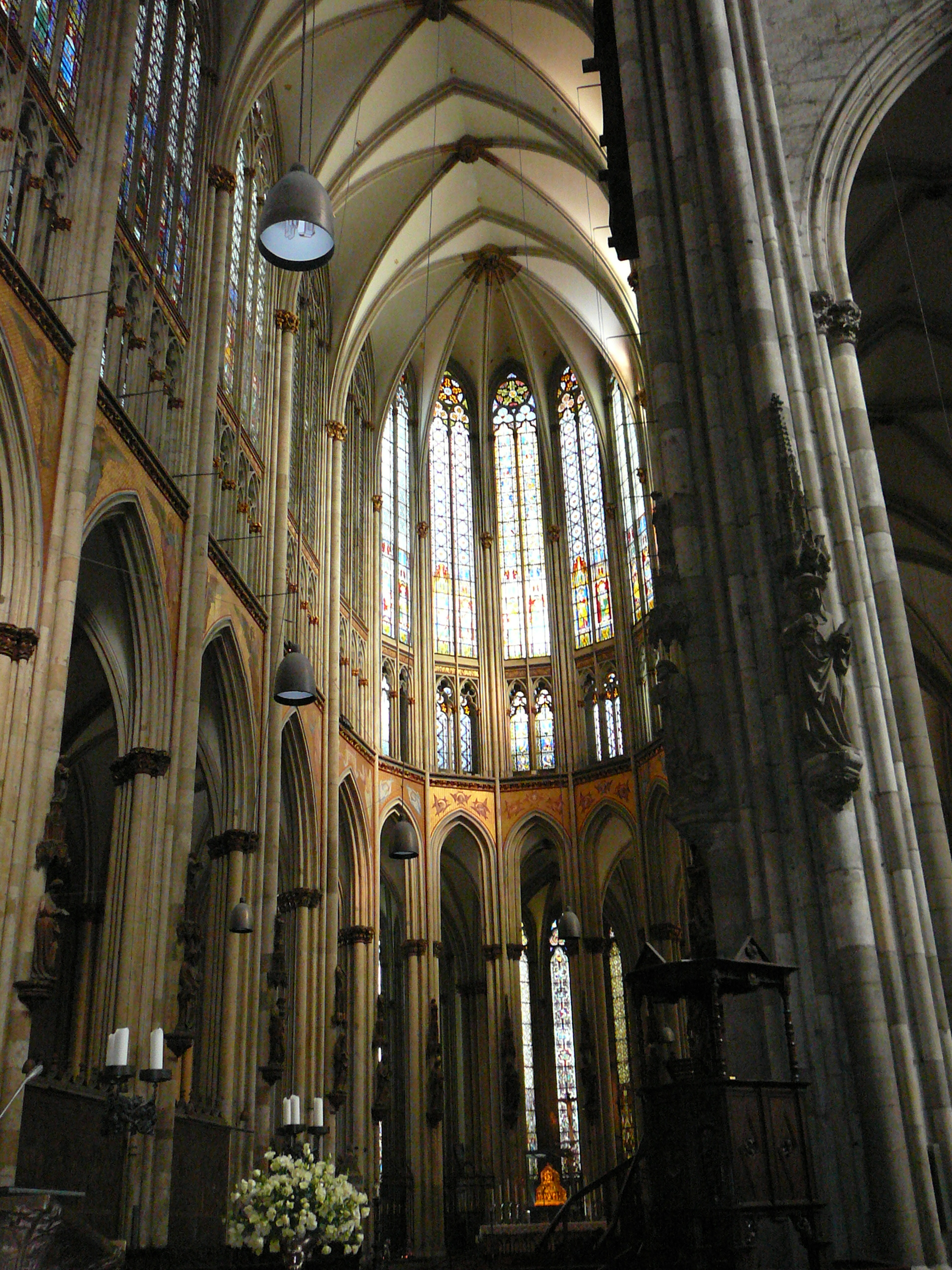
The medieval east end of Cologne Cathedral (begun 1248)

==== Columns and piers ====
In early French Gothic architecture, the capitals of the columns were modeled after Roman columns of the Corinthian order, with finely-sculpted leaves. They were used in the ambulatory of the Abbey church of Saint-Denis. According to its builder, the Abbot Suger, they were inspired by the columns he had seen in the ancient baths in Rome. They were used later at Sens, at Notre-Dame de Paris and at Canterbury in England.

In early Gothic churches with six-part rib vaults, the columns in the nave alternated with more massive piers to provide support for the vaults. With the introduction of the four-part rib vault, all of the piers or columns in the nave could have the same design. In the High Gothic period, a new form was introduced, composed of a central core surrounded several attached slender columns, or colonettes, going up to the vaults. These clustered columns were used at Chartres, Amiens, Reims and Bourges, Westminster Abbey and Salisbury Cathedral. Another variation was a quadrilobe column, shaped like a clover, formed of four attached columns. In England, the clustered columns were often ornamented with stone rings, as well as columns with carved leaves.

Later styles added further variations. Sometimes the piers were rectangular and fluted, as at Seville Cathedral, In England, parts of columns sometimes had contrasting colours, combining white stone with dark Purbeck marble. In place of the Corinthian capital, some columns used a stiff-leaf design. In later Gothic, the piers became much taller, reaching up more than half of the nave. Another variation, particularly popular in eastern France, was a column without a capital, which continued upward without capitals or other interruption, all the way to the vaults, giving a dramatic display of verticality.

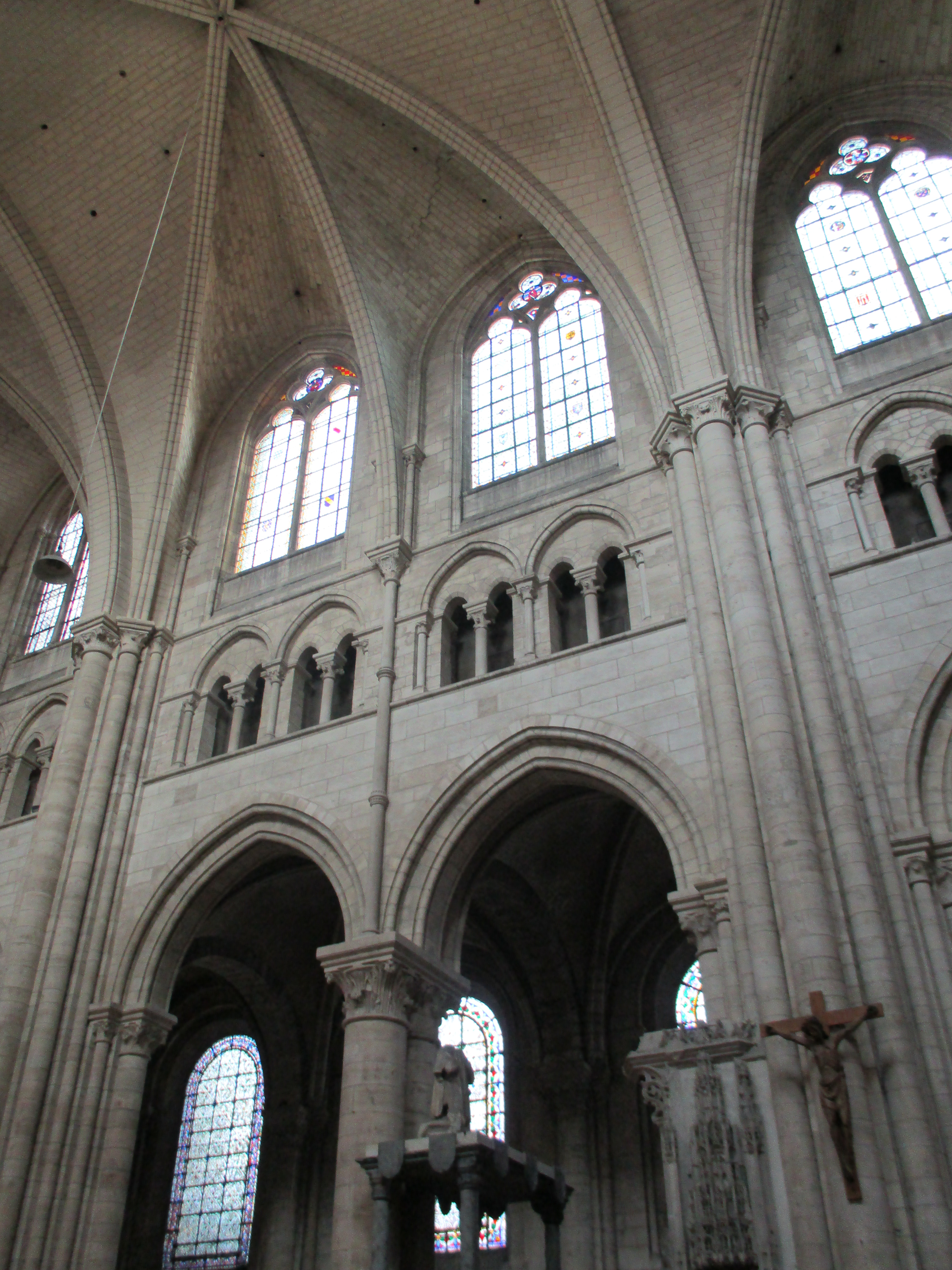
Early Gothic – Alternating columns and piers, Sens Cathedral (12th century)

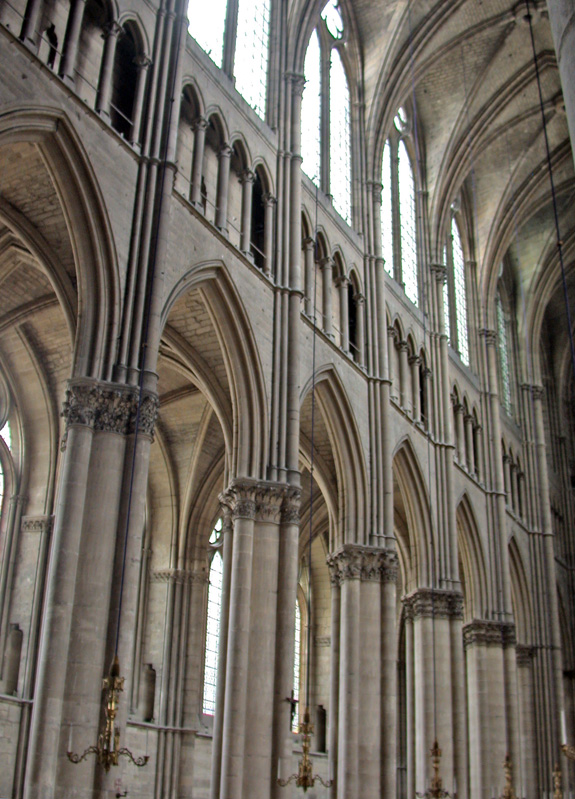
High Gothic – Clustered columns of Reims Cathedral (13th century)

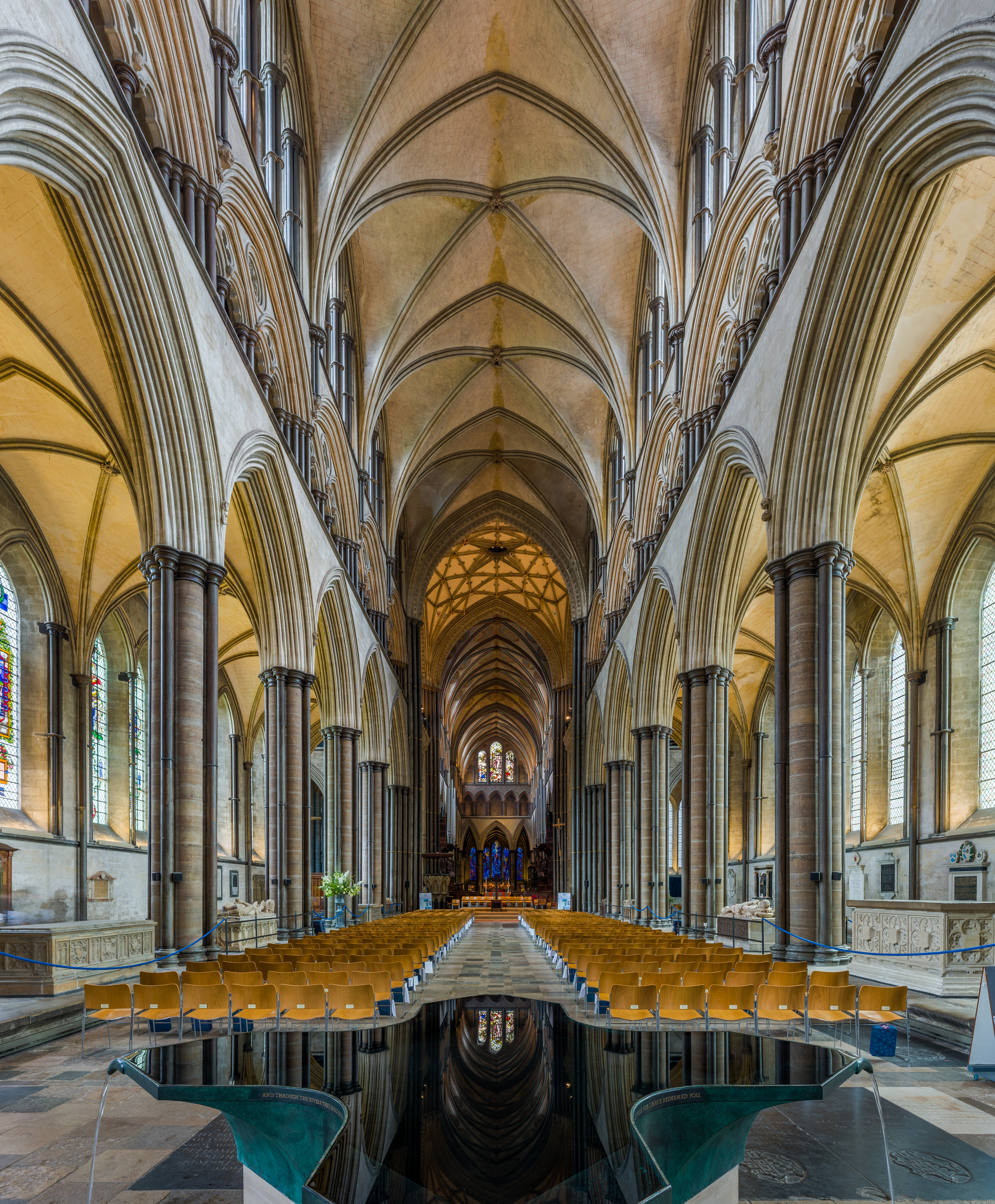
Early English Gothic – Clustered columns in Salisbury Cathedral (13th century)

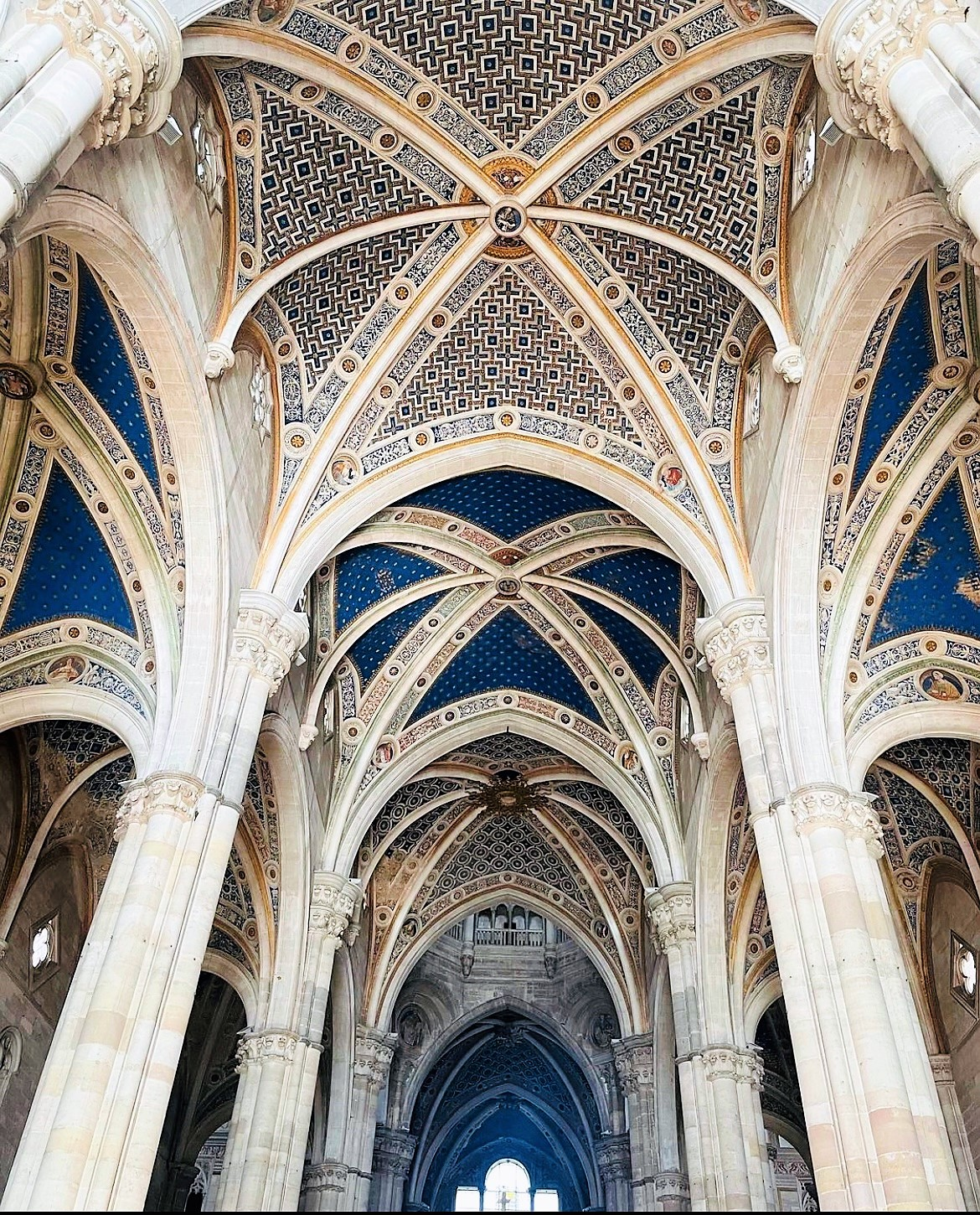
Late Gothic - Clustered columns in Certosa di Pavia (15th century).

=== Façades ===
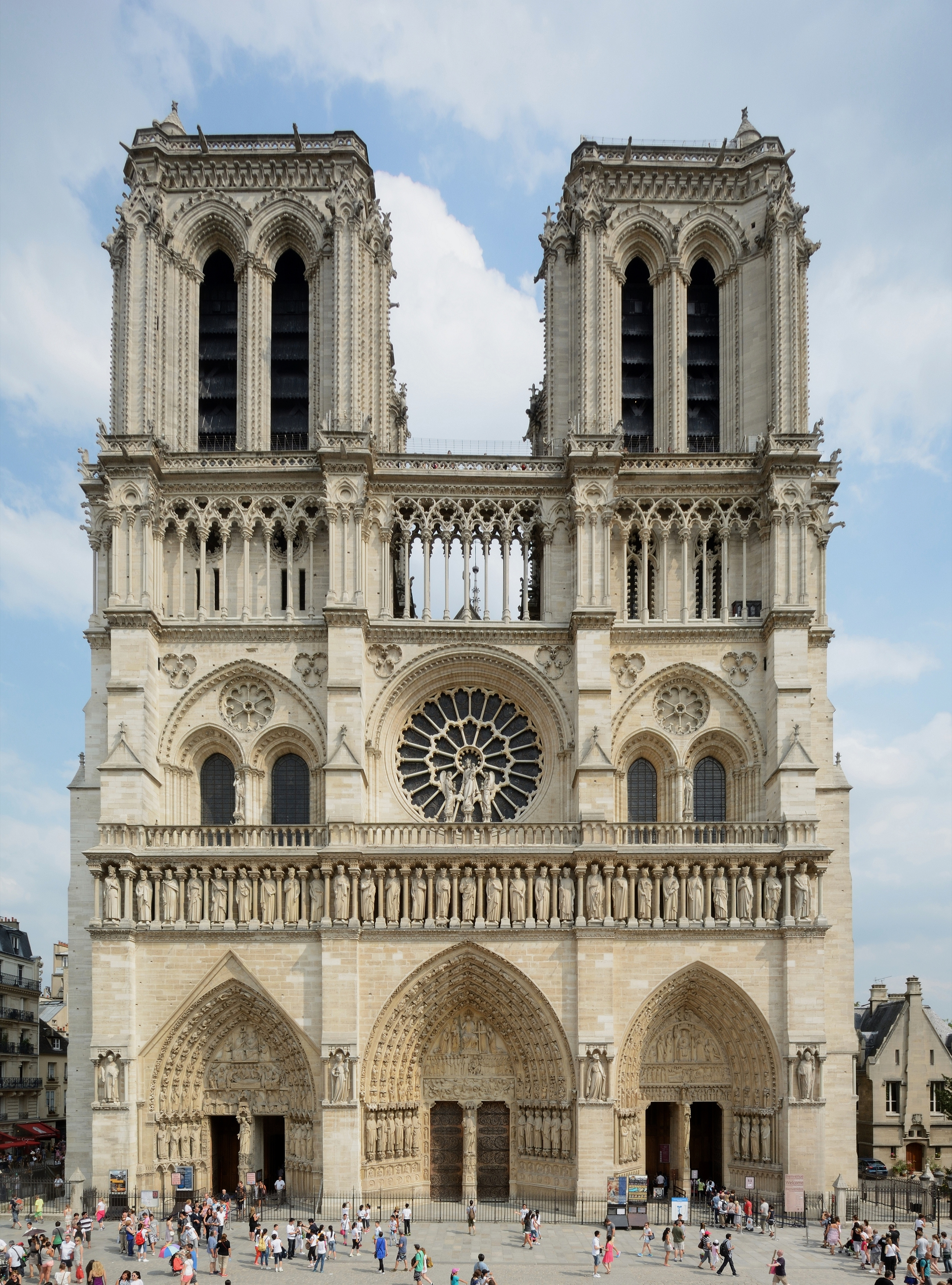
Notre-Dame de Paris – deep portals, a rose window, balance of horizontal and vertical elements. Early Gothic

Churches traditionally face east, with the altar at the east, and the west front, or façade, was considered the most important entrance. Gothic façades were adapted from the model of the Romanesque façades. The façades usually had three portals, or doorways, leading into the nave. Over each doorway was a tympanum, a work of sculpture crowded with figures. The sculpture of the central tympanum was devoted to the Last Judgement, that to the left to the Virgin Mary, and that to the right to the Saints honoured at that particular cathedral. In the early Gothic, the columns of the doorways took the form of statues of saints, making them literally "pillars of the church".

In the early Gothic, the façades were characterized by height, elegance, harmony, unity, and a balance of proportions. They followed the doctrine expressed by Saint Thomas Aquinas that beauty was a "harmony of contrasts". Following the model of Saint-Denis and later Notre-Dame de Paris, the façade was flanked by two towers proportional to the rest of the façade, which balanced the horizontal and vertical elements. Early Gothic façades often had a rose window placed above the central portal. In England lancet windows were used instead of a central rose.

In the High Gothic period, the façades grew higher, and had more dramatic architecture and sculpture. At Amiens Cathedral (c. 1220), the porches were deeper, the niches and pinnacles were more prominent. The portals were crowned with high arched gables, composed of concentric arches filled with sculpture. The rose windows became enormous, filling an entirely wall above the central portal, and they were themselves covered with a large pointed arch. The rose windows were pushed upwards by the growing profusion of decoration below. The towers were adorned with their own arches, often crowned with pinnacles. The towers themselves were crowned with spires, often of open-work sculpture. One of the finest examples of a Flamboyant façade is Notre-Dame de l'Épine (1405–1527).

While French cathedrals emphasized the height of the façade, English cathedrals, particularly in earlier Gothic, often emphasized the width. The west front of Wells Cathedral (begun c.1220) is 146 feet across, compared with 116 feet wide at the nearly contemporary Amiens Cathedral, though Amiens is twice as high. The west front of Wells was almost entirely covered with statuary, like Amiens, and was given further emphasis by its colours; traces of blue, scarlet, and gold are found on the sculpture, as well as painted stars against a dark background on other sections.

Italian Gothic façades have the three traditional portals and rose windows, or sometimes simply a large circular window without tracery plus an abundance of flamboyant elements, including sculpture, pinnacles and spires. However, they added distinctive Italian elements. as seen in the façades of Siena Cathedral and Orvieto Cathedral, The Orvieto façade was largely the work of Lorenzo Maitani, who worked on it from 1308 until his death in 1330. He broke away from the French emphasis on height and statuary, and covered the façade with colourful mosaics of biblical scenes (The current mosaics are of a later date). He also added sculpture in relief on the supporting buttresses. Another important feature of the Italian Gothic portal was the sculpted bronze door. The sculptor Andrea Pisano made the celebrated bronze doors for Florence Baptistry (1330–1336). They were not the first; Abbot Suger had commissioned bronze doors for Saint-Denis in 1140, which were later replaced with wooden doors. Pisano's work, with its realism and emotion, pointed toward the coming Renaissance.

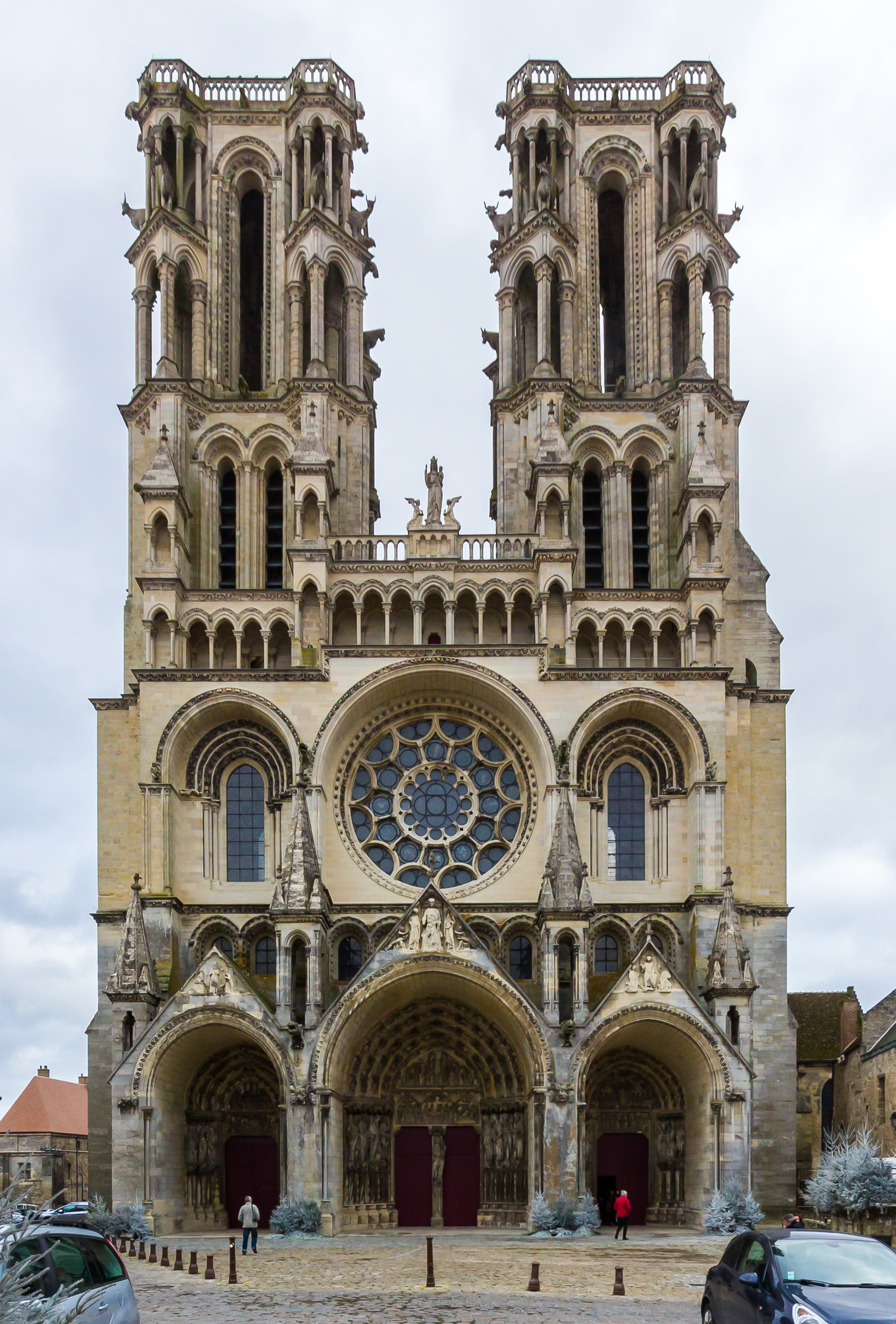
Laon Cathedral (late 12th century), still with rounded arches

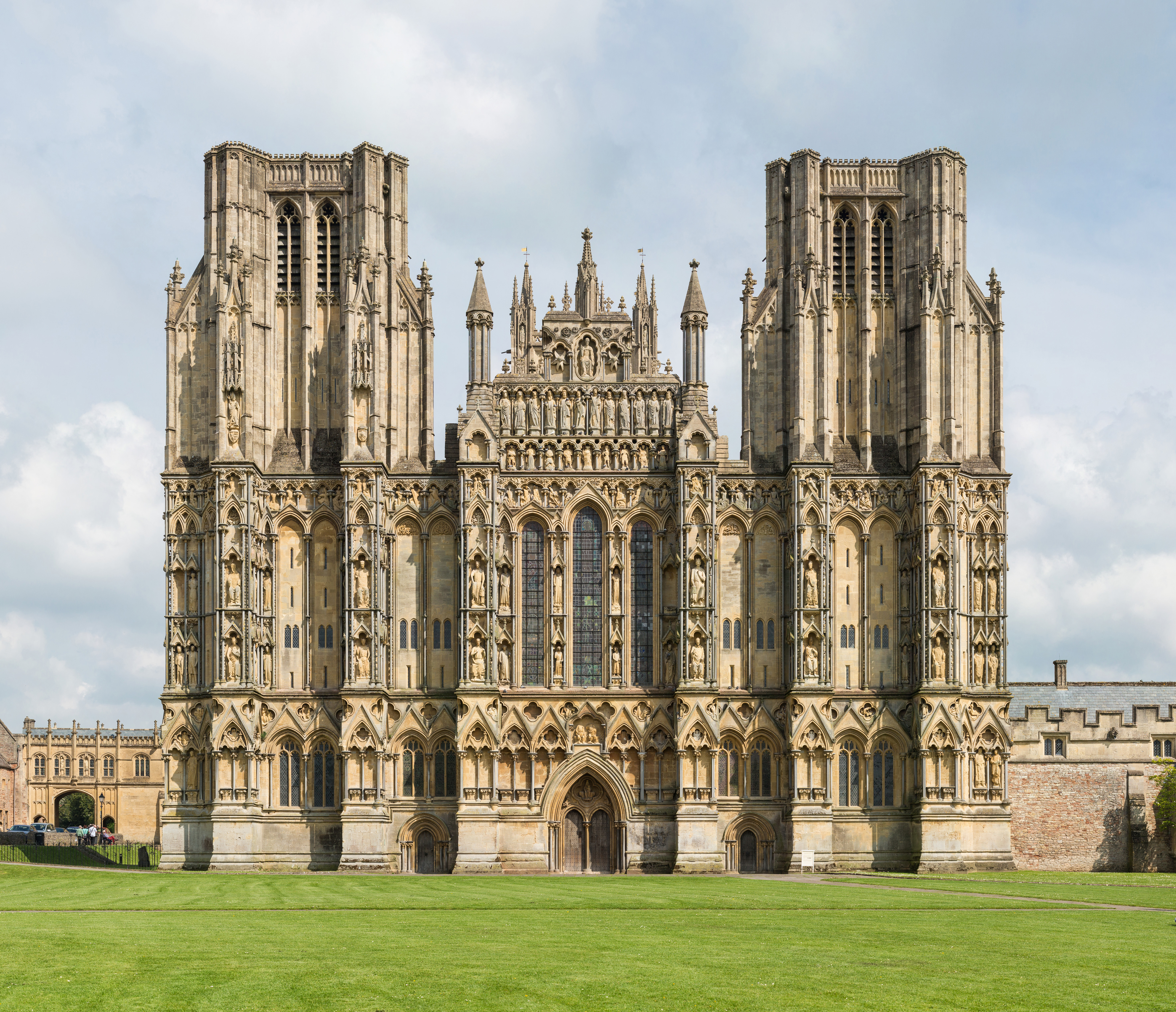
Wells Cathedral (façade begun c.1220). Early English screen of sculpture. The towers are 14th century.

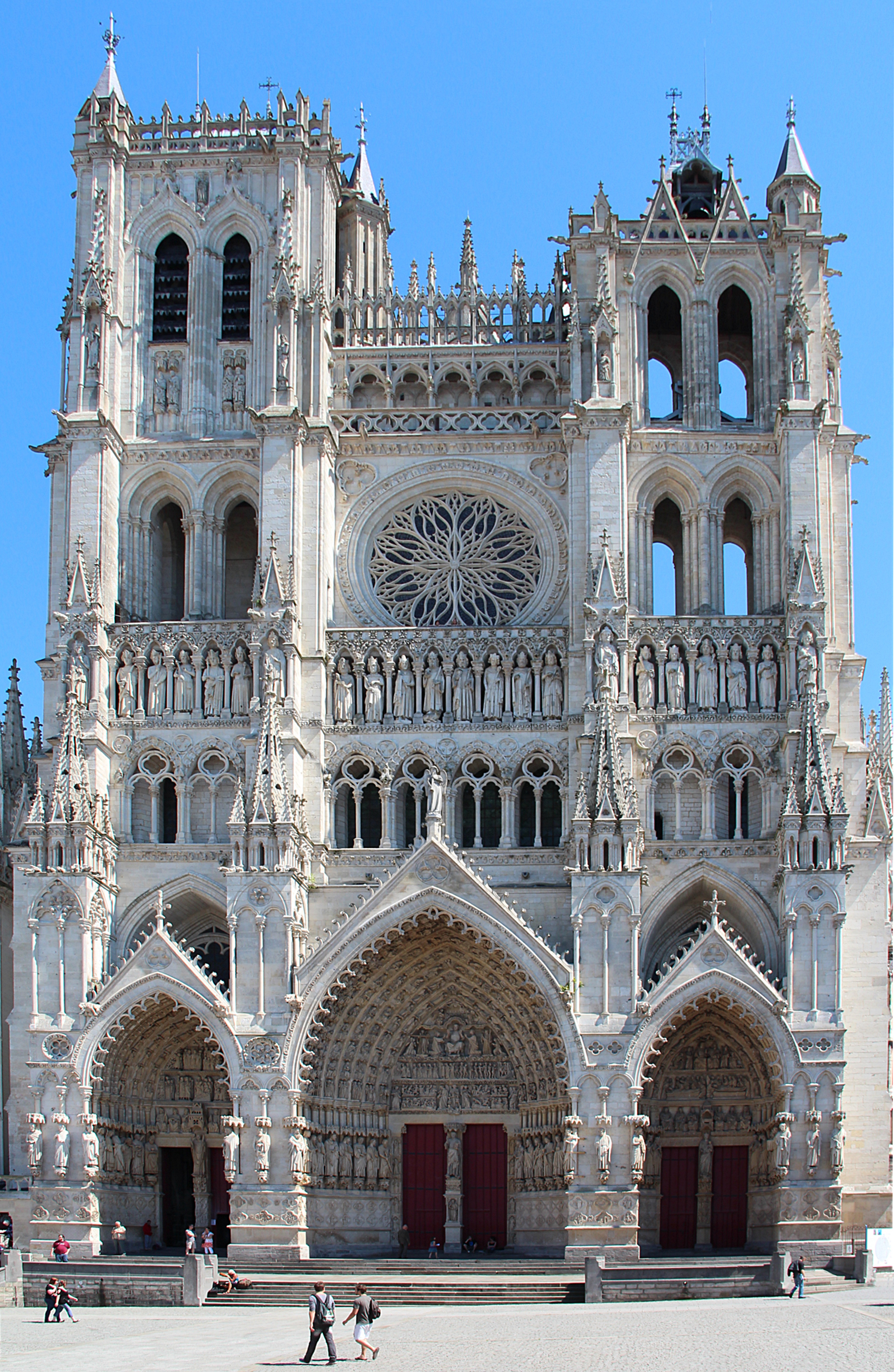
Amiens Cathedral, (13th century). Vertical emphasis. High Gothic

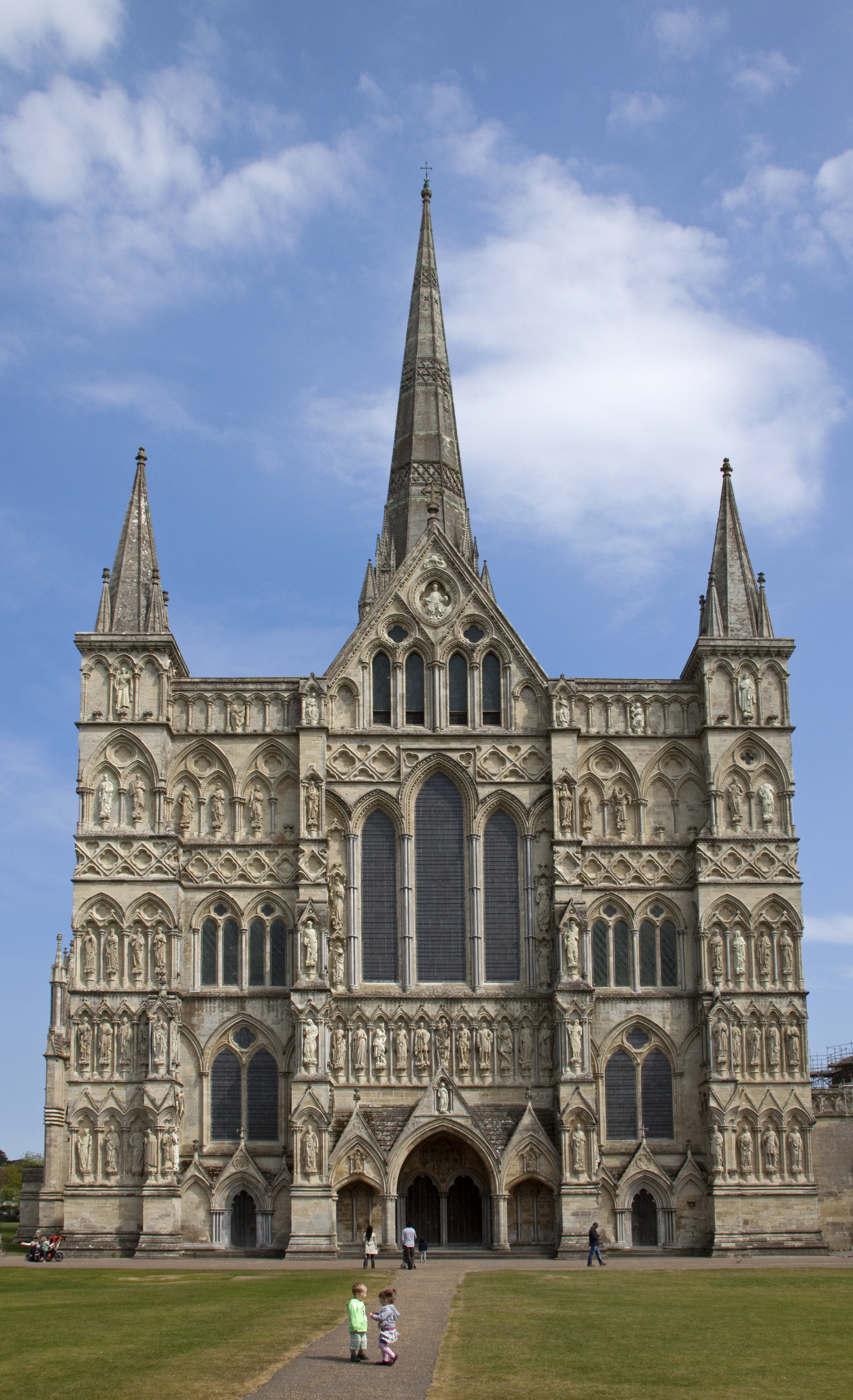
Salisbury Cathedral – wide sculptured screen, lancet windows, turrets with pinnacles. (1220–1258)

Strasbourg Cathedral (1275–1486), a façade entirely covered in sculpture and tracery

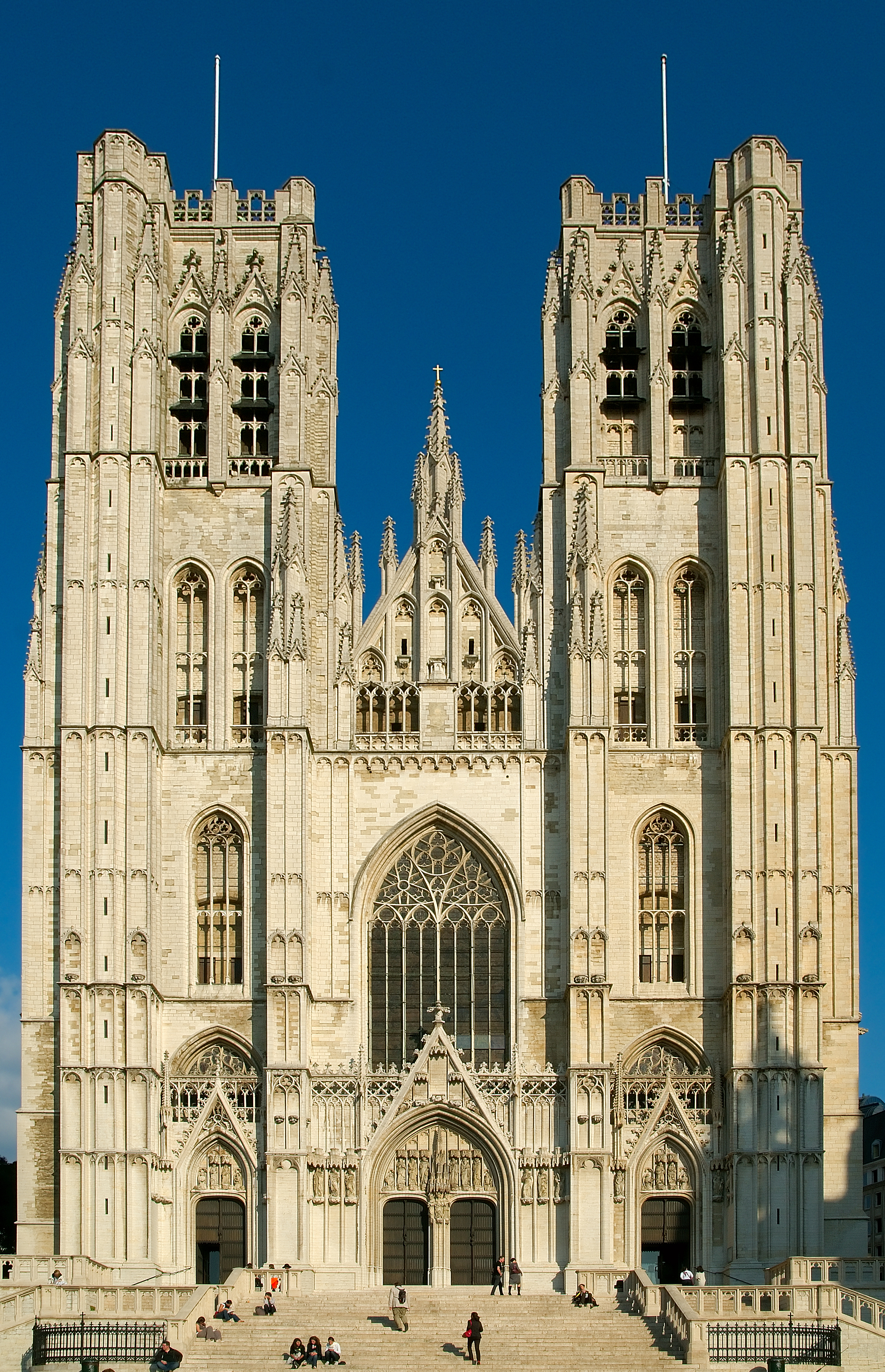
Cathedral of St. Michael and St. Gudula in Brussels, a towered highly decorated façade

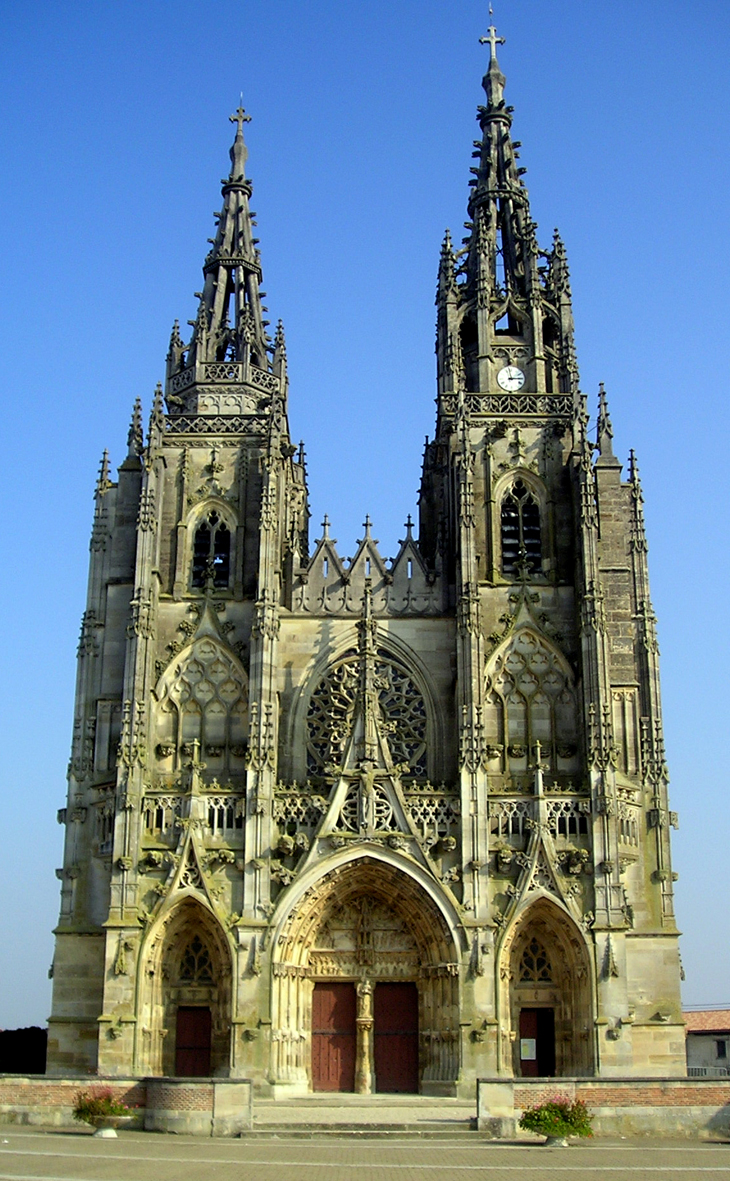
Flamboyant façade of Notre-Dame de l'Épine (1405–1527) with openwork spires

Orvieto Cathedral (1310–), with polychrome mosaics

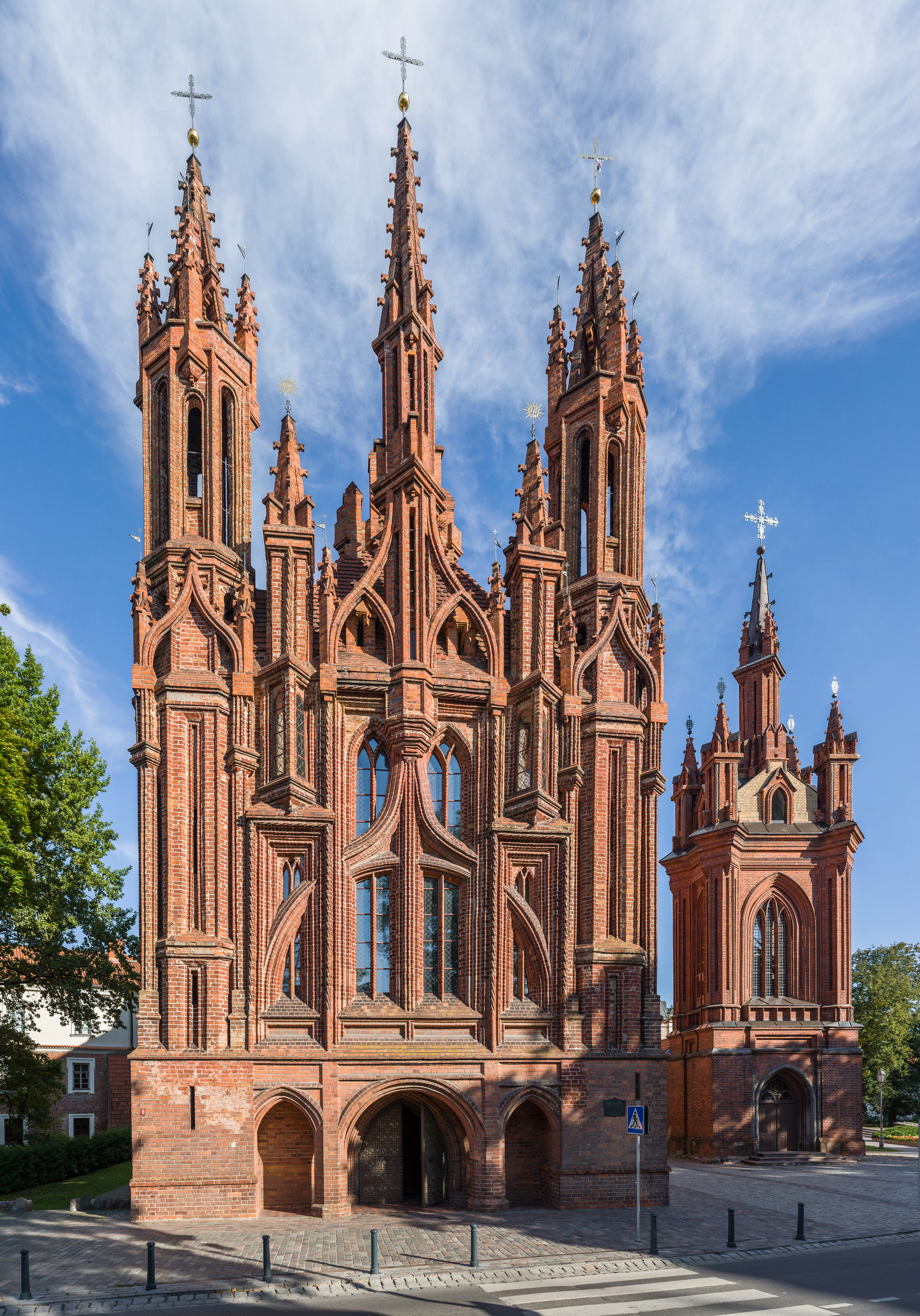
Late Gothic façade of Church of St. Anne in Vilnius (c.1500)

=== Sculpture ===
==== Portals and tympana ====
Sculpture was an important element of Gothic architecture. Its intent was present the stories of the Bible in vivid and understandable fashion to the great majority of the faithful who could not read. The iconography of the sculptural decoration on the façade was not left to the sculptors. An edict of the Second Council of Nicaea in 787 had declared: "The composition of religious images is not to be left to the inspiration of artists; it is derived from the principles put in place by the Catholic Church and religious tradition. Only the art belongs to the artist; the composition belongs to the Fathers."

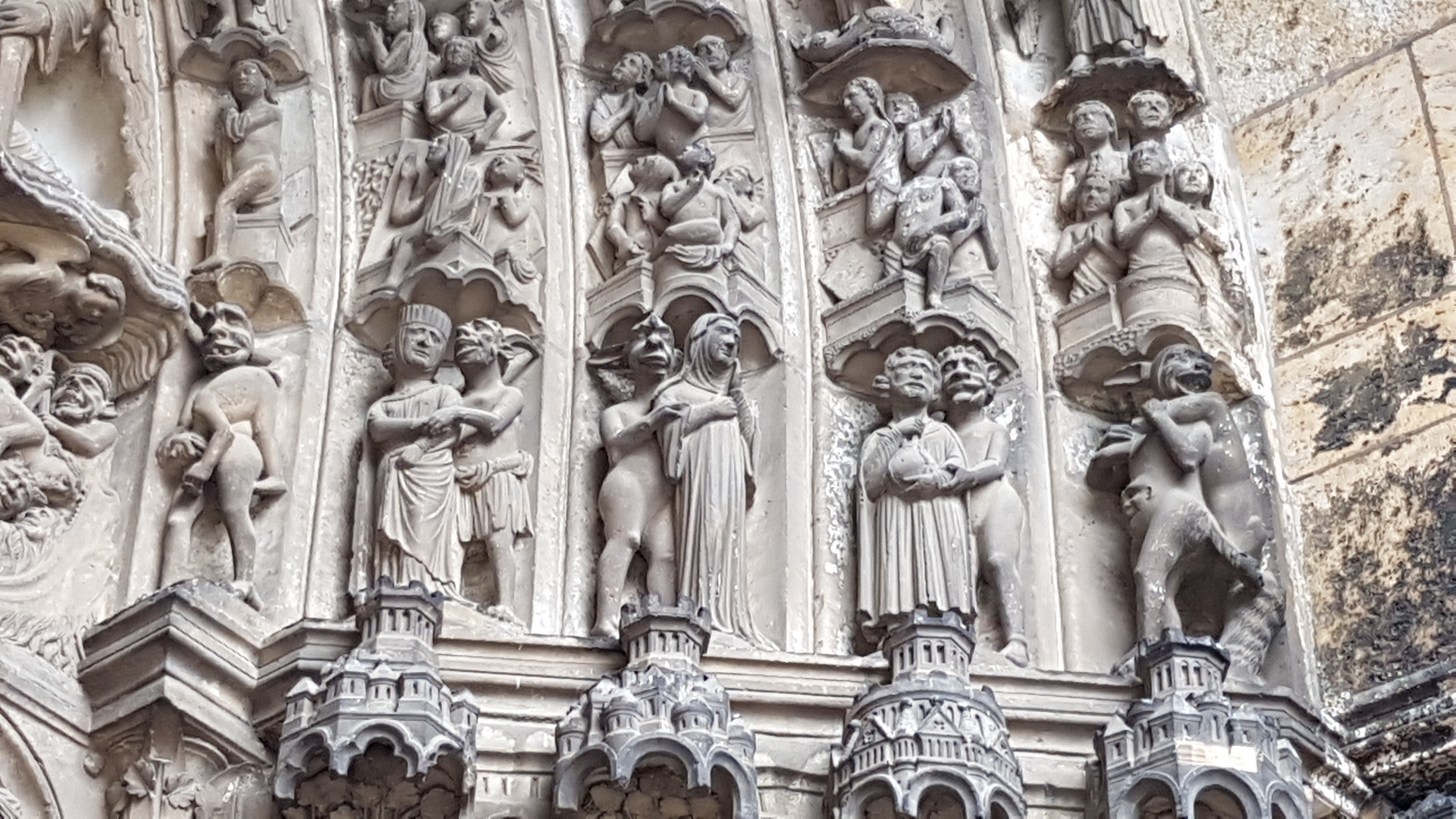
Monsters and devils tempting Christians – South portal of Chartres Cathedral (13th century)

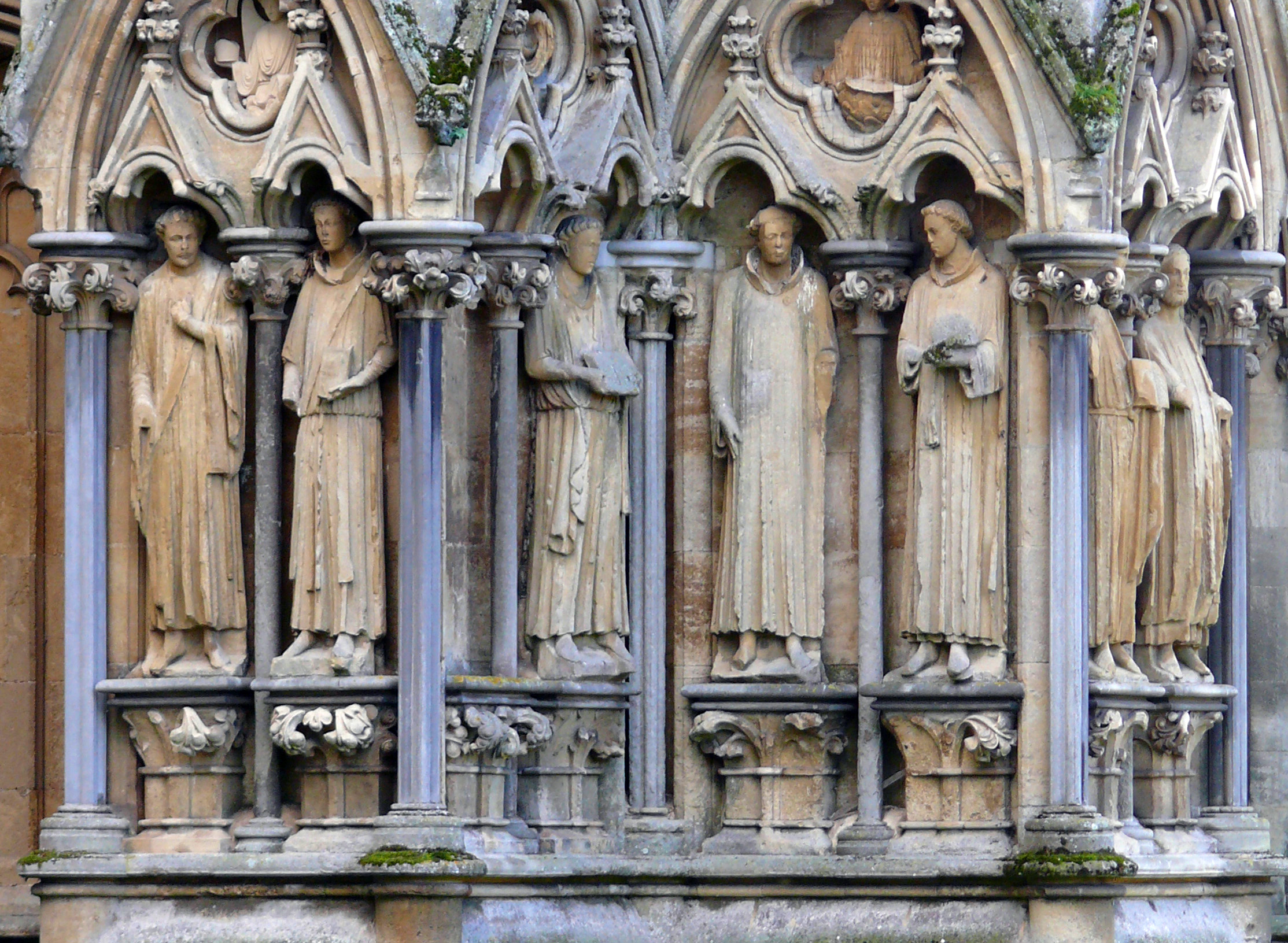
Gallery of Kings and Saints on the façade of Wells Cathedral (13th century)

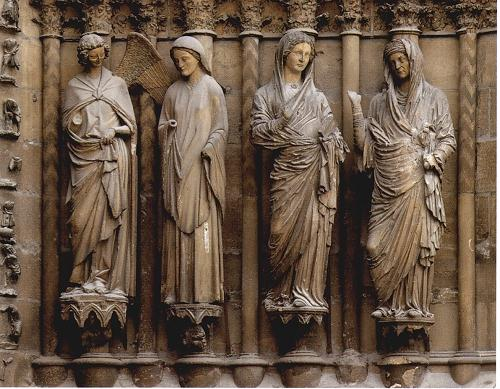
West portal Annunciation group at Reims Cathedral with smiling angel at left (13th century)

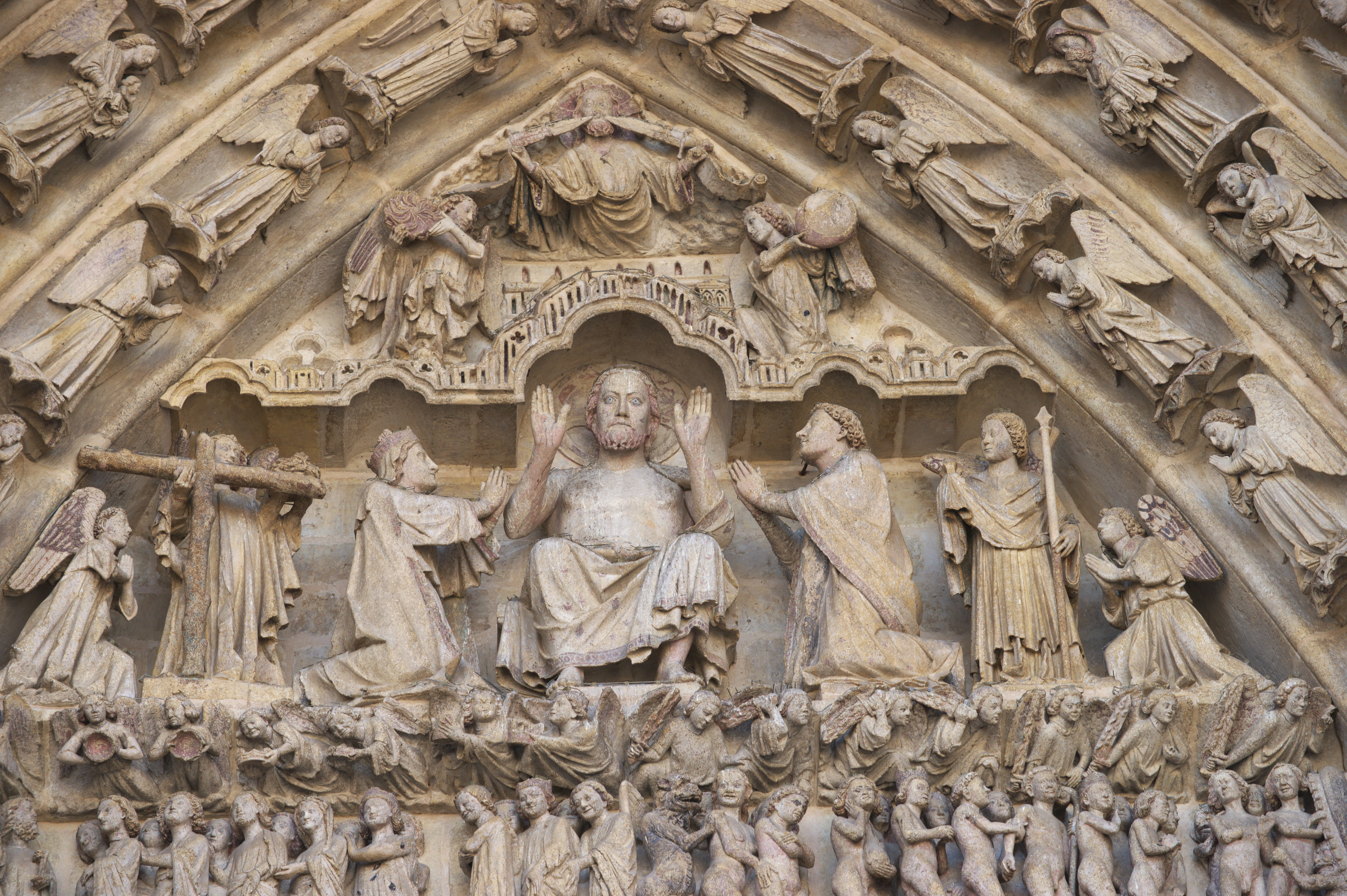
Notre-Dame d'Amiens, tympanum detail – "Christ in majesty" (13th century)

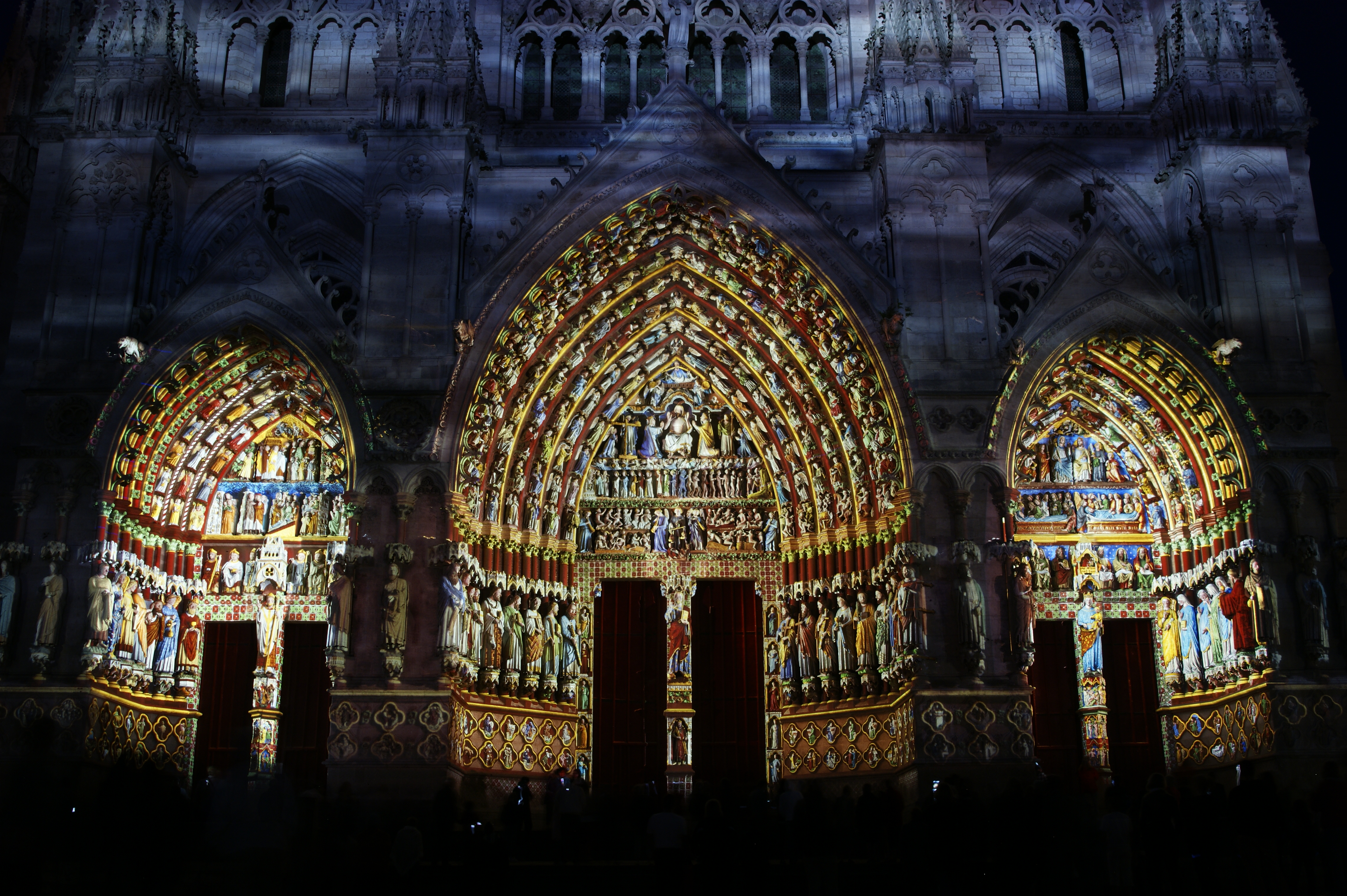
Amiens Cathedral illuminated as it may have appeared when painted

In Early Gothic churches, following the Romanesque tradition, sculpture appeared on the façade or west front in the triangular tympanum over the central portal. Gradually, as the style evolved, the sculpture became more and more prominent, taking over the columns of the portal, and gradually climbing above the portals, until statues in niches covered the entire façade, as in Wells Cathedral, to the transepts, and, as at Amiens Cathedral, even on the interior of the façade.

Some of the earliest examples are found at Chartres Cathedral, where the three portals of the west front illustrate the three epiphanies in the Life of Christ. At Amiens, the tympanum over the central portal depicted the Last Judgement, the right portal showed the Coronation of the Virgin, and the left portal showed the lives of saints who were important in the diocese. This set a pattern of complex iconography which was followed at other churches.

The columns below the tympanum are in the form of statues of saints, literally representing them as "the pillars of the church". Each saint had his own symbol at his feet so viewers could recognize them; a winged lion meant Saint Mark, an eagle with four wings meant Saint John the Apostle, and a winged bull symbolized Saint Luke. Floral and vegetal decoration was also very common, representing the Garden of Eden; grapes represented the wines of Eucharist.

The tympanum over the central portal on the west façade of Notre-Dame de Paris vividly illustrates the Last Judgement, with figures of sinners being led off to hell, and good Christians taken to heaven. The sculpture of the right portal shows the coronation of the Virgin Mary, and the left portal shows the lives of saints who were important to Parisians, particularly Saint Anne, the mother of the Virgin Mary.

To make the message even more prominent, the sculpture of the tympanum was painted in bright colors. following a system of colours codified in the 12th century; yellow, called gold, symbolized intelligence, grandeur and virtue; white, called argent, symbolized purity, wisdom, and correctness; black, or sable, meant sadness, but also will; green, or sinople, represented hope, liberty and joy; red or gueules (see gules) meant charity or victory; blue or azure symbolised the sky, faithfulness and perseverance; and violet, or pourpre, was the colour of royalty and sovereignty.

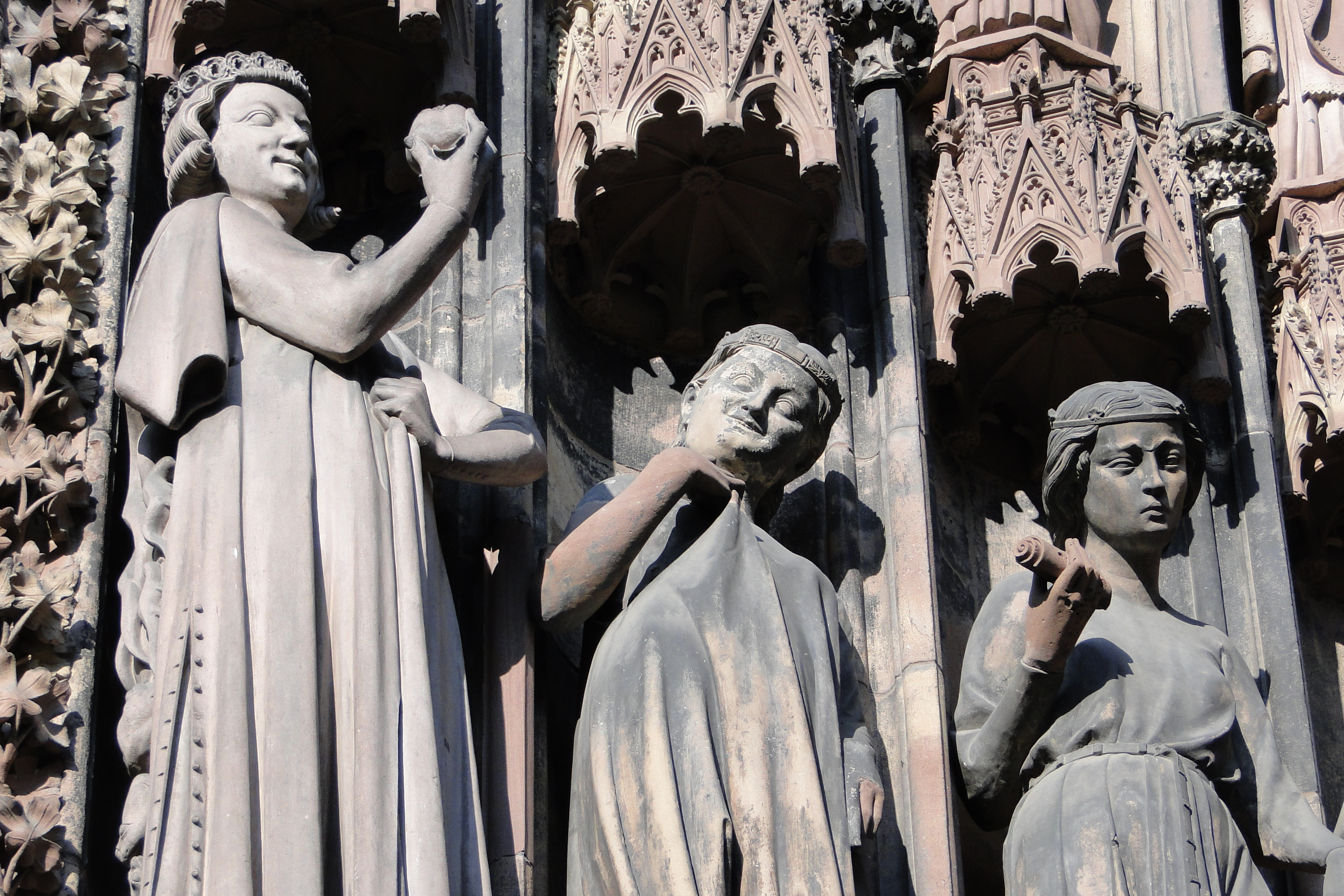
More naturalistic later Gothic: Temptation of the Foolish Virgins, Strasbourg Cathedral

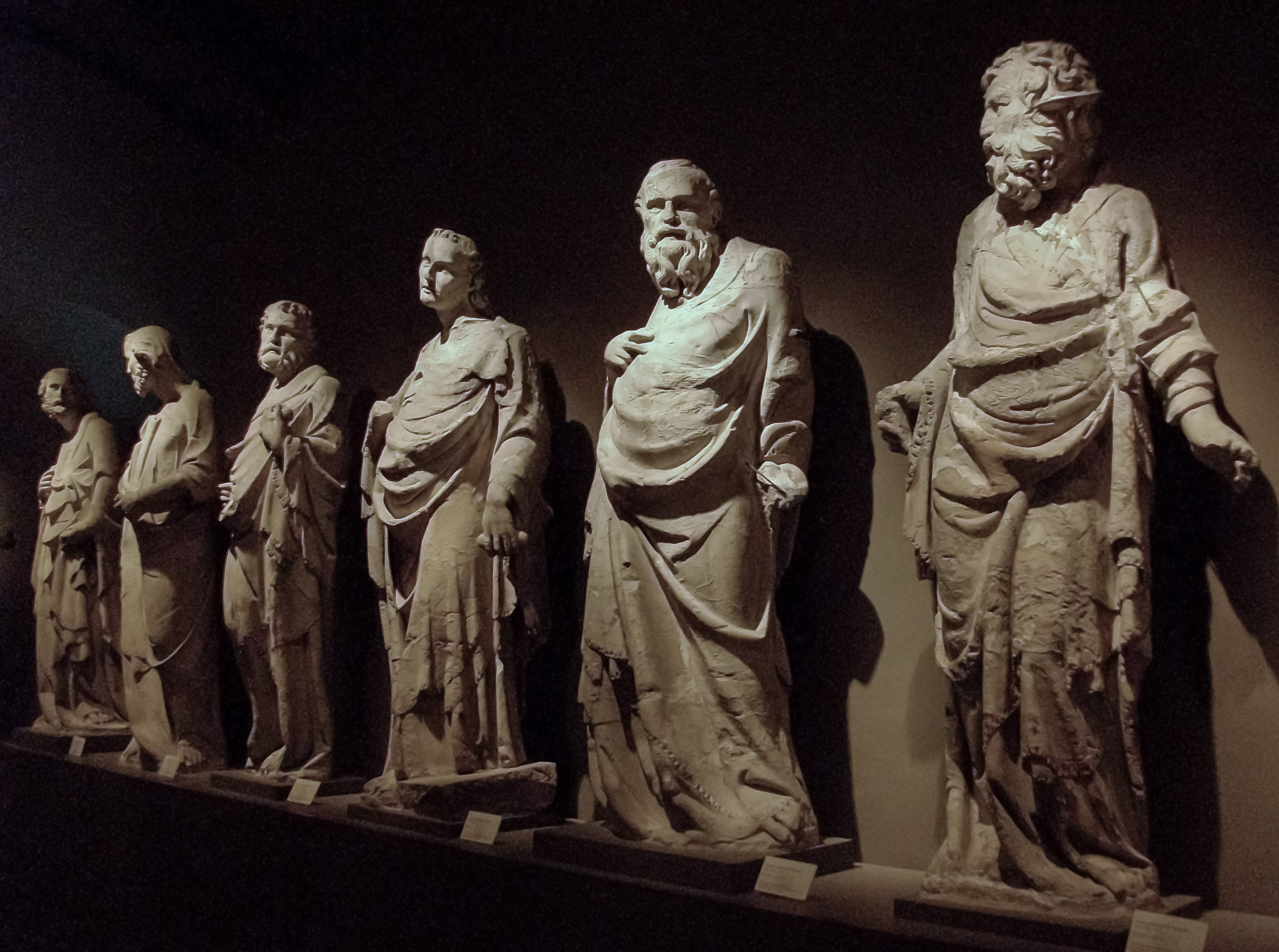
Sculpture from façade of Siena Cathedral by Nino Pisano (14th century)

In the later Gothic, the sculpture became more naturalistic; the figures were separated from the walls, and had much more expressive faces, showing emotion and personality. The drapery was very skilfully carved. The torments of hell were even more vividly depicted. The late Gothic sculpture at Siena Cathedral, by Nino Pisano, pointing toward the Renaissance, is particularly notable. Much of it is now kept in a museum to protect it from deterioration.

==== Grotesques and gargoyles ====
A grotesque at St Peter's Church, Winchcombe. Note the lack of water spout.

Besides saints and apostles, the exteriors of Gothic churches were also decorated with sculptures of grotesques or monsters. These included the chimera, a mythical hybrid creature which usually had the body of a lion and the head of a goat, and the strix or stryge, a creature resembling an owl or bat, which was said to eat human flesh. They were part of the visual message for the illiterate worshippers, symbols of the evil and danger that threatened those who did not follow the teachings of the church.

Gargoyles had a more practical purpose. They were the rain spouts of the church, designed to throw rainwater away from the building, to prevent erosion. To produce many thin streams rather than a torrent of water, a large number of gargoyles were used, so they were also designed to be a decorative element of the architecture. The rainwater ran from the roof into lead gutters, then down channels on the flying buttresses, then along a channel cut in the back of the gargoyle and out of the mouth away from the church.

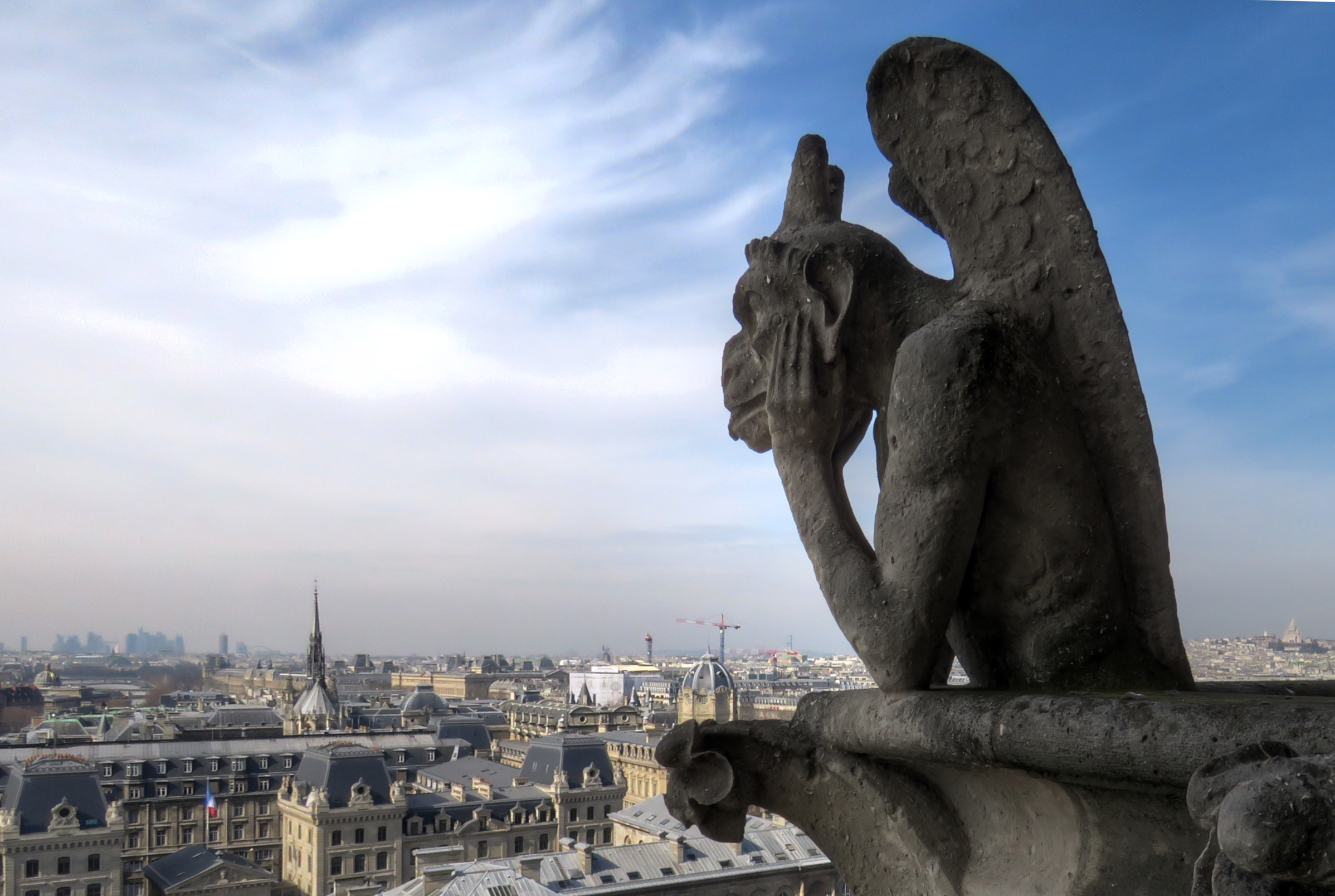
A strix at Notre-Dame de Paris (19th century copy)

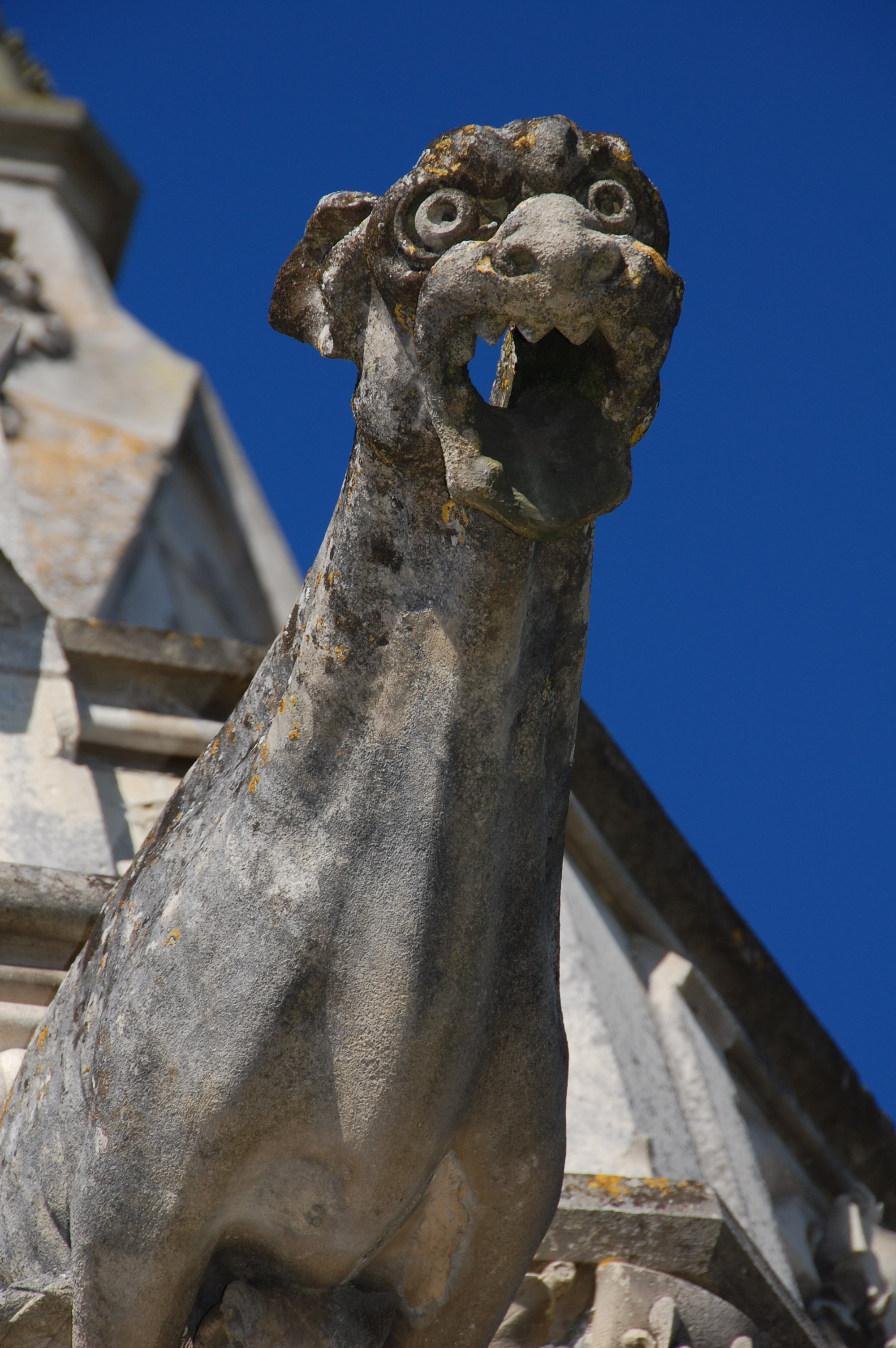
A gargoyle at the Château d'Amboise, showing the hole for the rainwater.

=== Floors ===
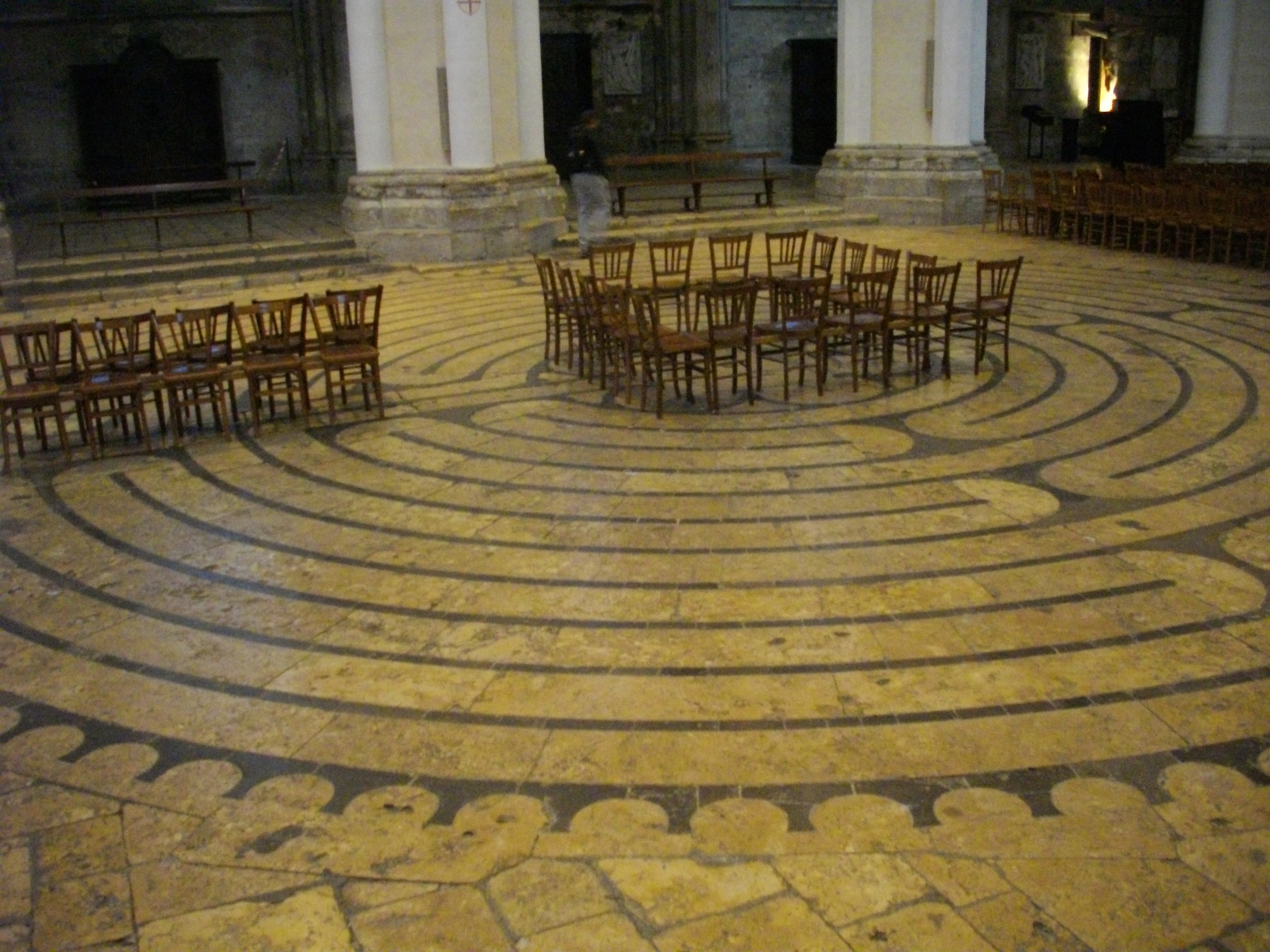
13th century labyrinth at Chartres Cathedral

A feature of some Gothic cathedrals in France was a labyrinth or maze on the floor of the nave, which symbolised the difficult and often complicated journey of a Christian life before salvation. Most labyrinths have been removed, but that at Chartres Cathedral still exists essentially in its original form. Reims Cathedral had a labyrinth depicting the master masons of the cathedral, but this was destroyed in the 18th century.

== Elements of Romanesque and Gothic architecture compared ==
#	Structural element	Romanesque	Gothic	Developments
1	Arches	Round	Pointed	The pointed Gothic arch varied from a very sharp form, to a wide, flattened form.
2	Vaults	Barrel or groin	Ribbed	Ribbed vaults appeared in the Romanesque era and were elaborated in the Gothic era.
3	Walls	Thick, with small openings	Thinner, with large openings	Wall structure diminished during the Gothic era to a framework of mullions supporting windows.
4	Buttresses	Wall buttresses of low projection.	Wall buttresses of high projection, and flying buttresses	Complex Gothic buttresses supported the high vaults and the walls pierced with windows
5	Windows	Round arches, sometimes paired	Pointed arches, often with tracery	Gothic windows varied from simple lancet form to ornate flamboyant patterns
6	Piers and columns	Cylindrical columns, rectangular piers	Cylindrical and clustered columns, complex piers	Columns and piers developed increasing complexity during the Gothic era
7	Gallery arcades	Two openings under an arch, paired.	Two pointed openings under a pointed arch	The Gothic gallery became increasingly complex and unified with the clerestory

== Secular architecture ==
=== Palaces ===
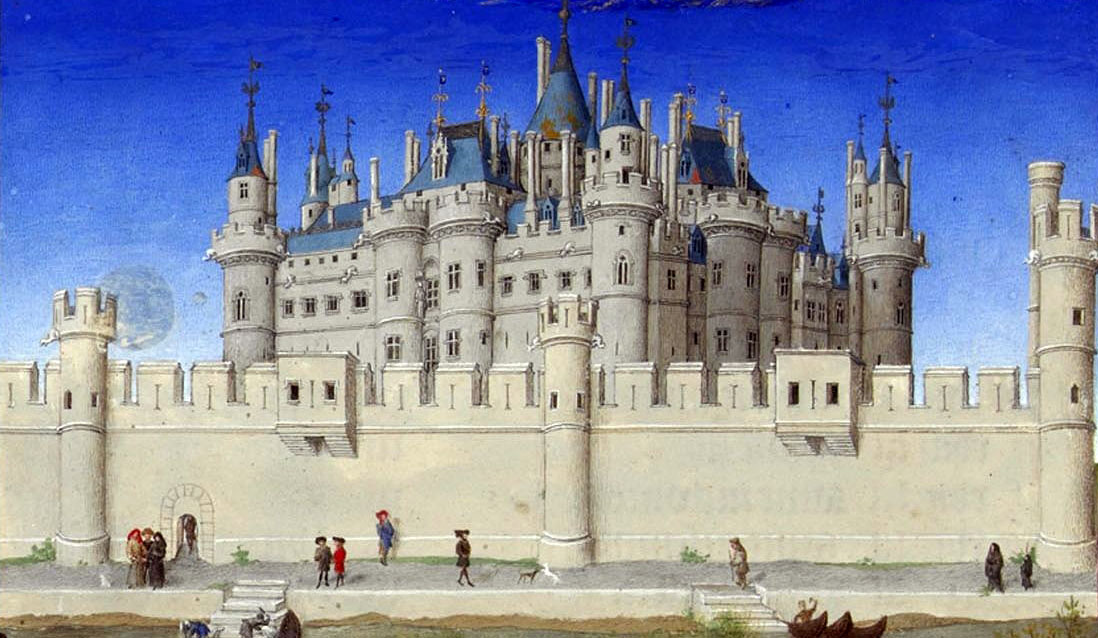
Medieval Louvre in early 15th century

The Gothic style was used in royal and papal residences as well as in churches. Prominent examples include the Palais de la Cité the Medieval Louvre, the Chateau de Vincennes in Paris, residences of the French kings, the Doge's Palace in Venice, and the Palace of the Kings of Navarre in Olite (1269–1512). Another is the Palais des Papes (Palace of the Popes), the former Papal residence in Avignon. It was constructed between 1252 and 1364, during the Avignon Papacy. Given the complicated political situation, it combined the functions of a church, a seat of government and a fortress.

The Palais de la Cité in Paris, close to Notre-Dame de Paris, begun in 1119, which was the principal residence of the French kings until 1417. Most of the Palais de la Cité is gone, but two of the original towers along the Seine, of the towers, the vaulted ceilings of the Hall of the Men-at-Arms (1302), (now in the Conciergerie); and the original chapel, Sainte-Chapelle, can still be seen.

The Louvre Palace was originally built by Philippe II of France beginning in 1190 to house the King's archives and treasures, and given machicoulis and features of a Gothic fortress. However, it was soon made obsolete by the development of artillery, and in the 15th century it was remodelled into a comfortable residential palace. While the outer walls retained their original military appearance, the castle itself, with a profusion of spires, towers, pinnacles, arches and gables, became a visible symbol of royalty and aristocracy. The style was copied in chateaux and other aristocratic residences across France and other parts of Europe.

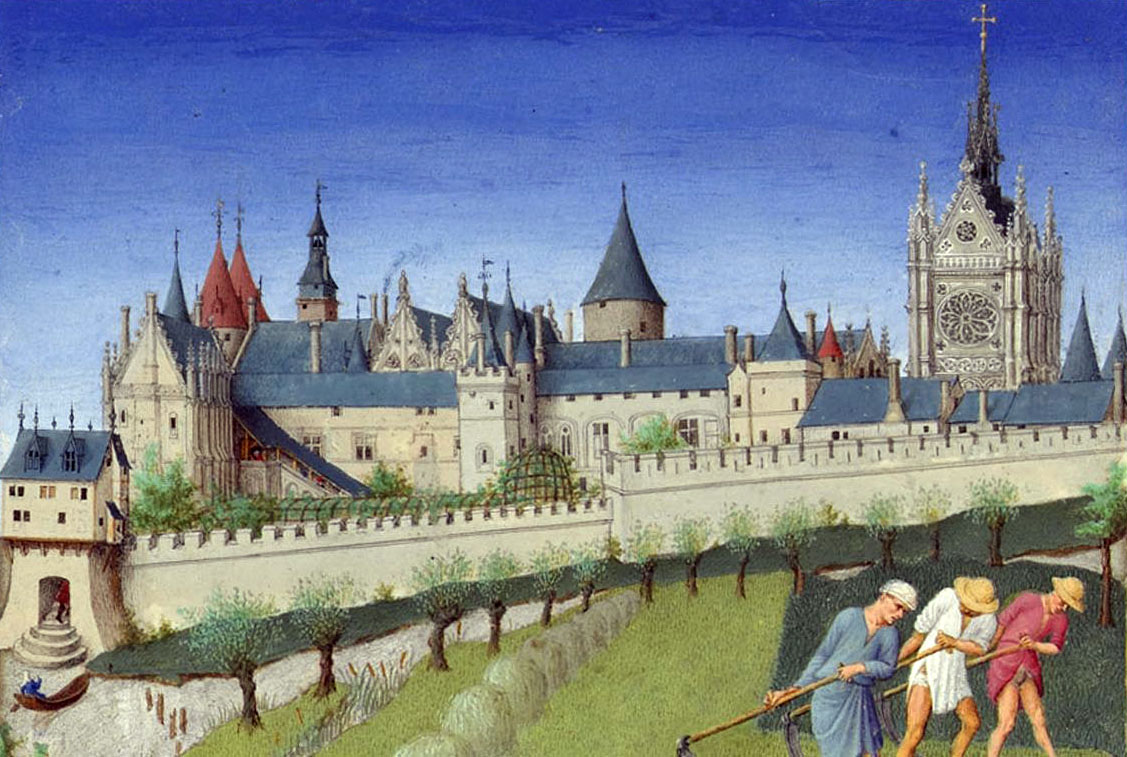
Palais de la Cité (1119–) and Sainte-Chapelle (1238–48), Paris

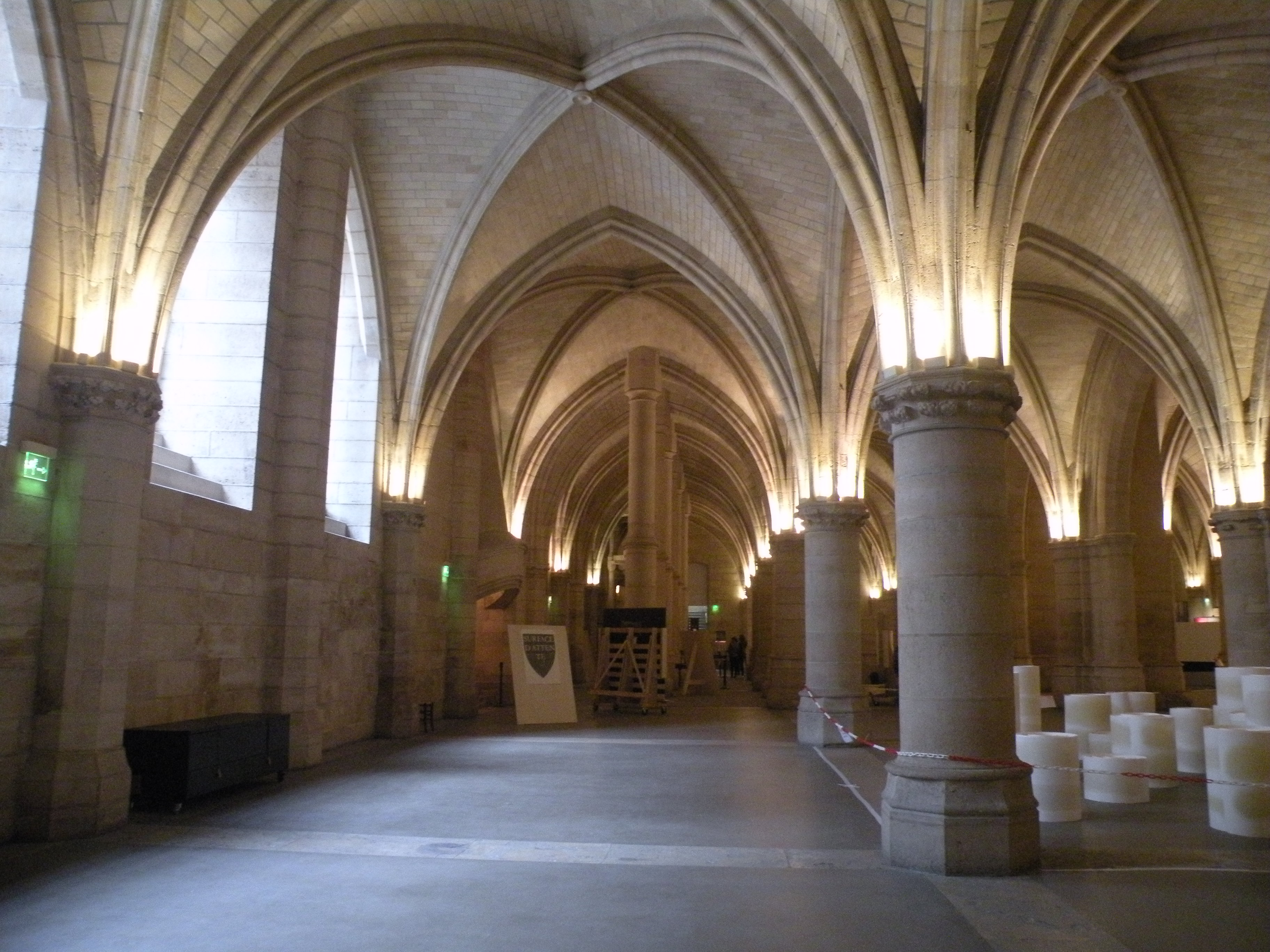
Hall of men-at-arms, Conciergerie of the Palais de la Cité

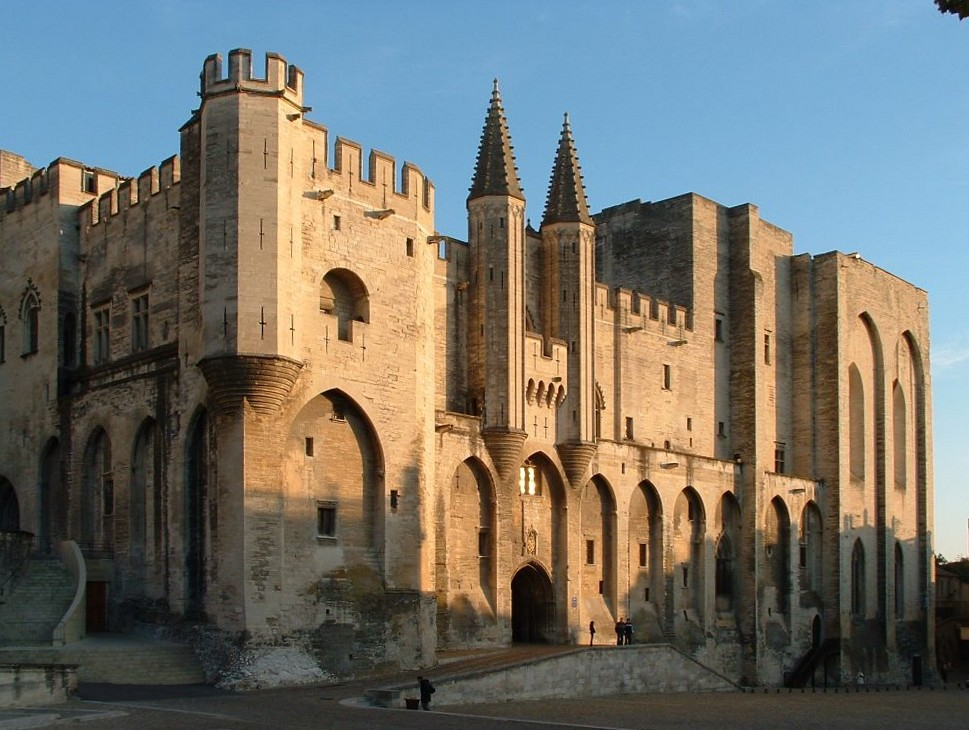
Façade of the Palais des Papes, Avignon (1252–1364)

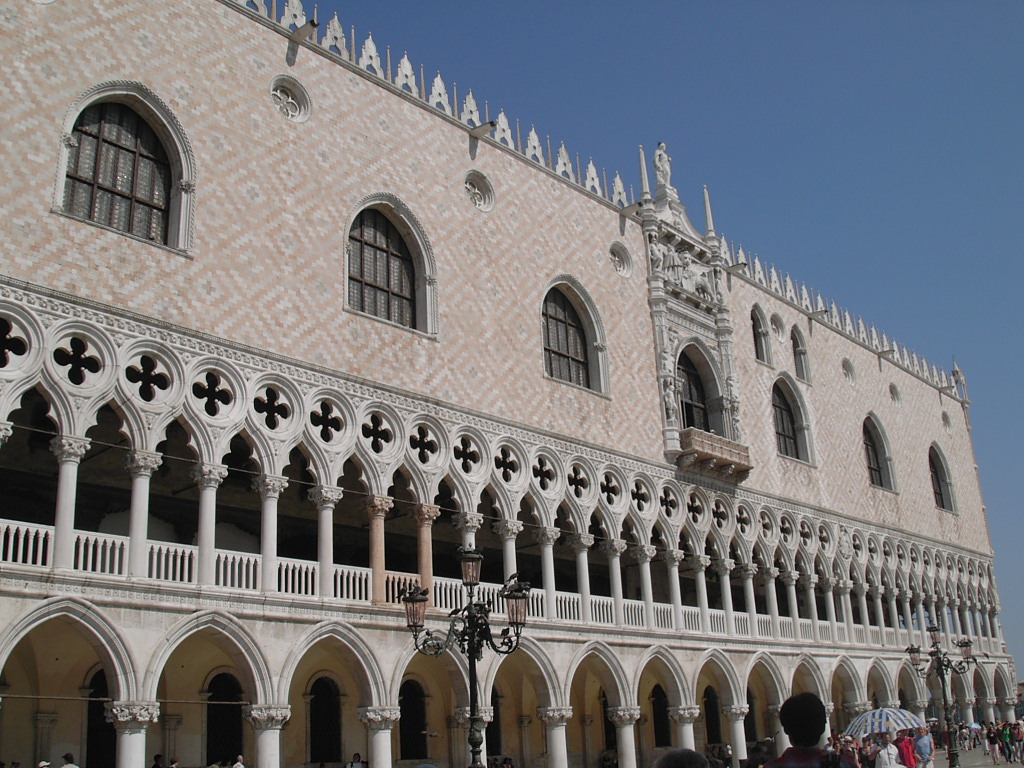
The Doge's Palace, Venice (1340–1442)

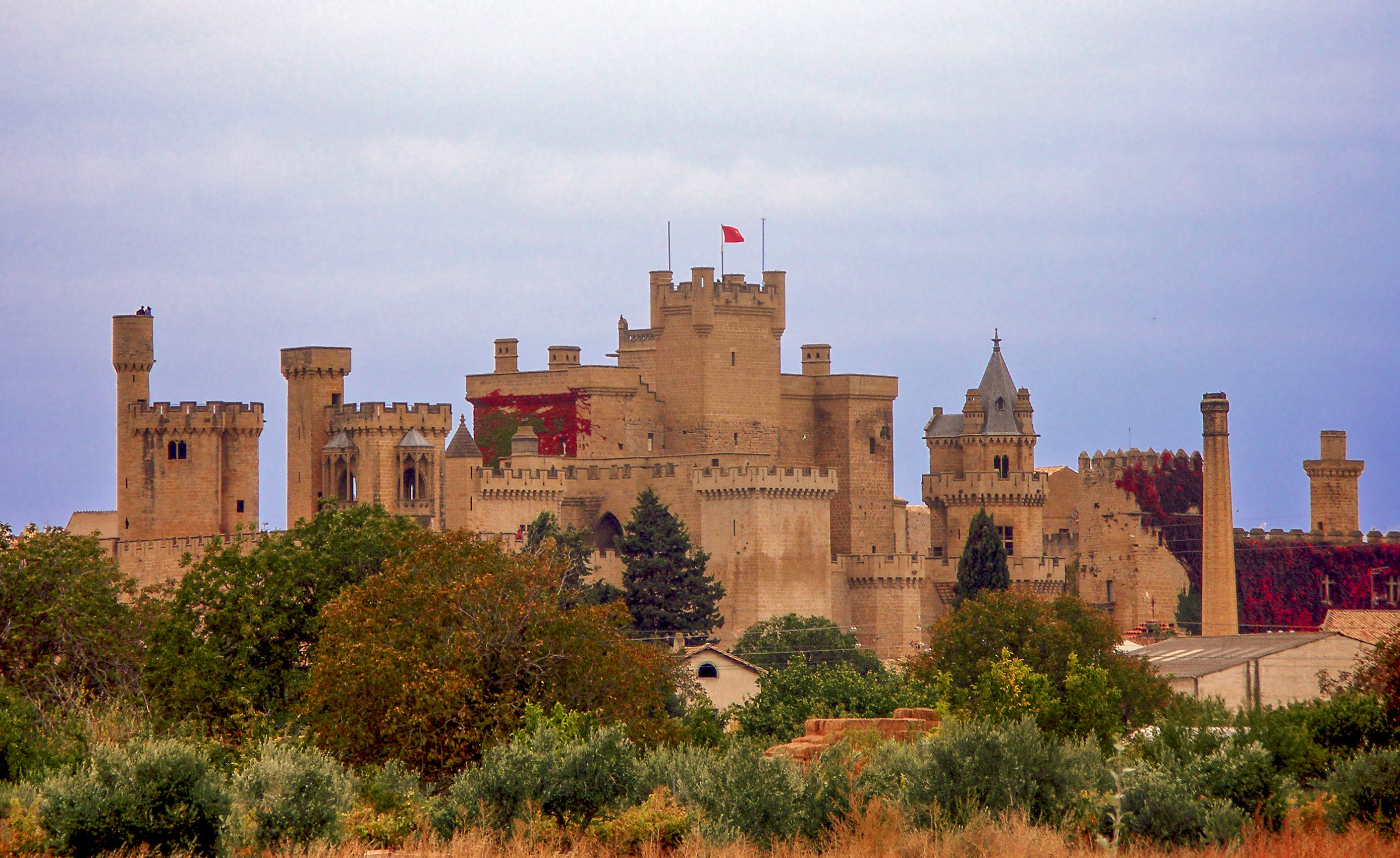
Palace of the Kings of Navarre, Olite (1269–1512)

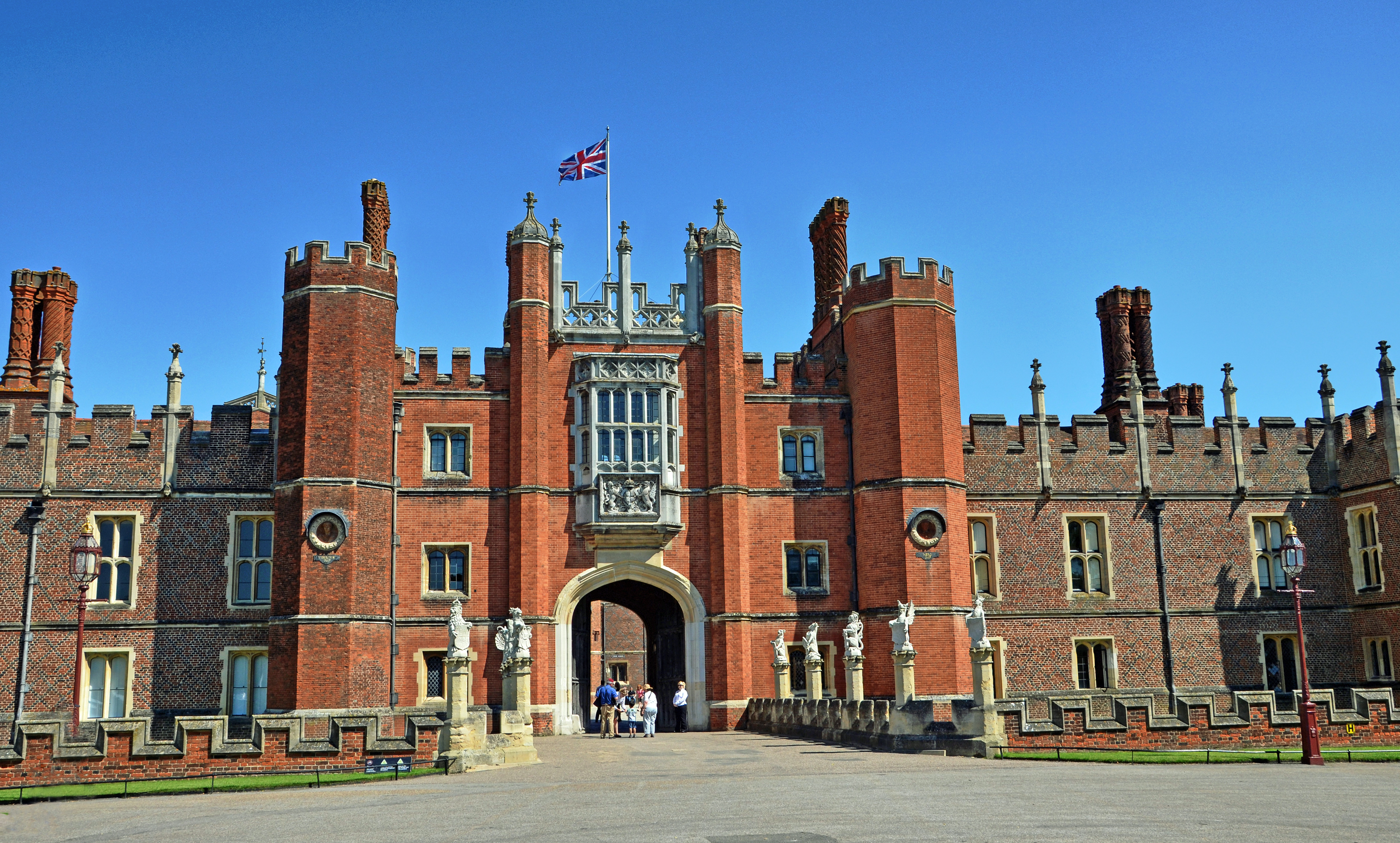
Great Gatehouse at Hampton Court Palace, London (1522)

=== Civic architecture ===
In the 15th century, following the late Gothic period or flamboyant style, elements of Gothic decoration began to appear in the town halls of northern France, Flanders and the Netherlands. The Rouen Courthouse in Normandy is representative of Flamboyant Gothic in France. The Hôtel de Ville of Compiègne has an imposing Gothic bell tower, featuring a spire surrounded by smaller towers, and its windows are decorated with ornate accolades or ornamental arches. Similarly flamboyant town halls were found in Arras, Douai, and Saint-Quentin, Aisne, and in modern Belgium, in Brussels, Ghent, Bruges, Audenarde, Mons and Leuven.

Gothic civil architecture in Spain includes the Silk Exchange in Valencia, Spain (1482–1548), a major marketplace, which has a main hall with twisting columns beneath its vaulted ceiling.

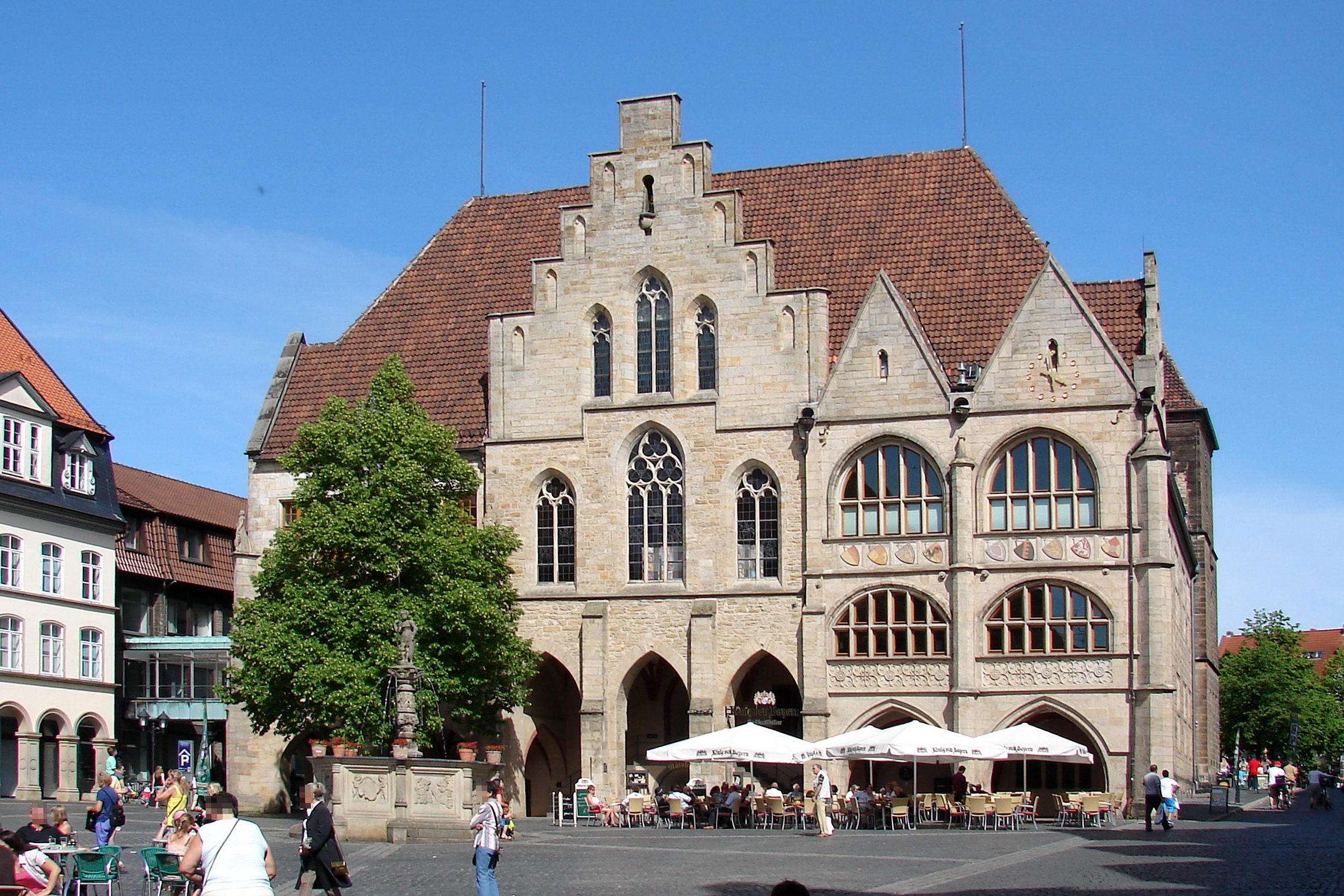
Hildesheim Town Hall, Germany (13/14th c.)

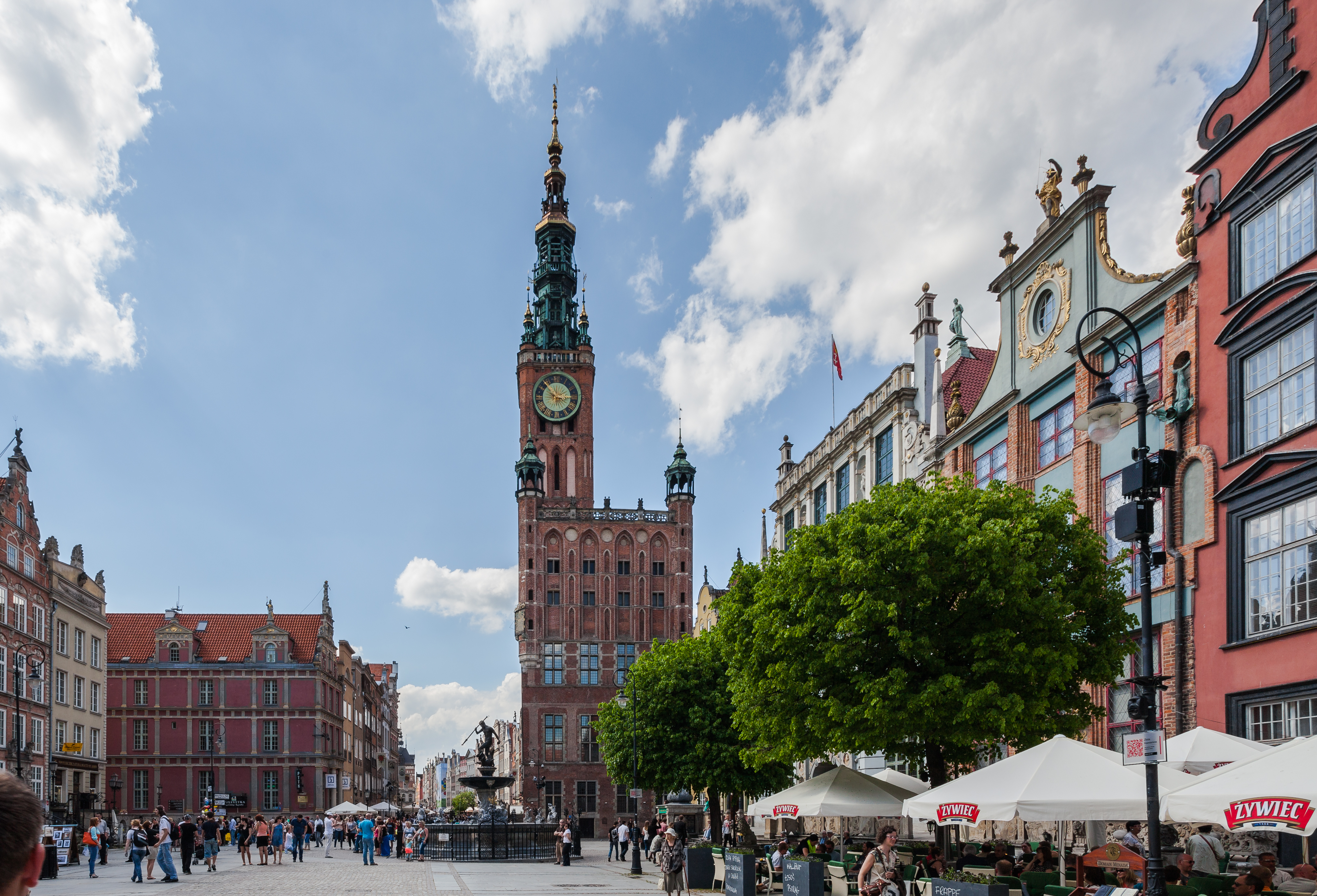
Gdańsk Town Hall, Poland (15th c.)

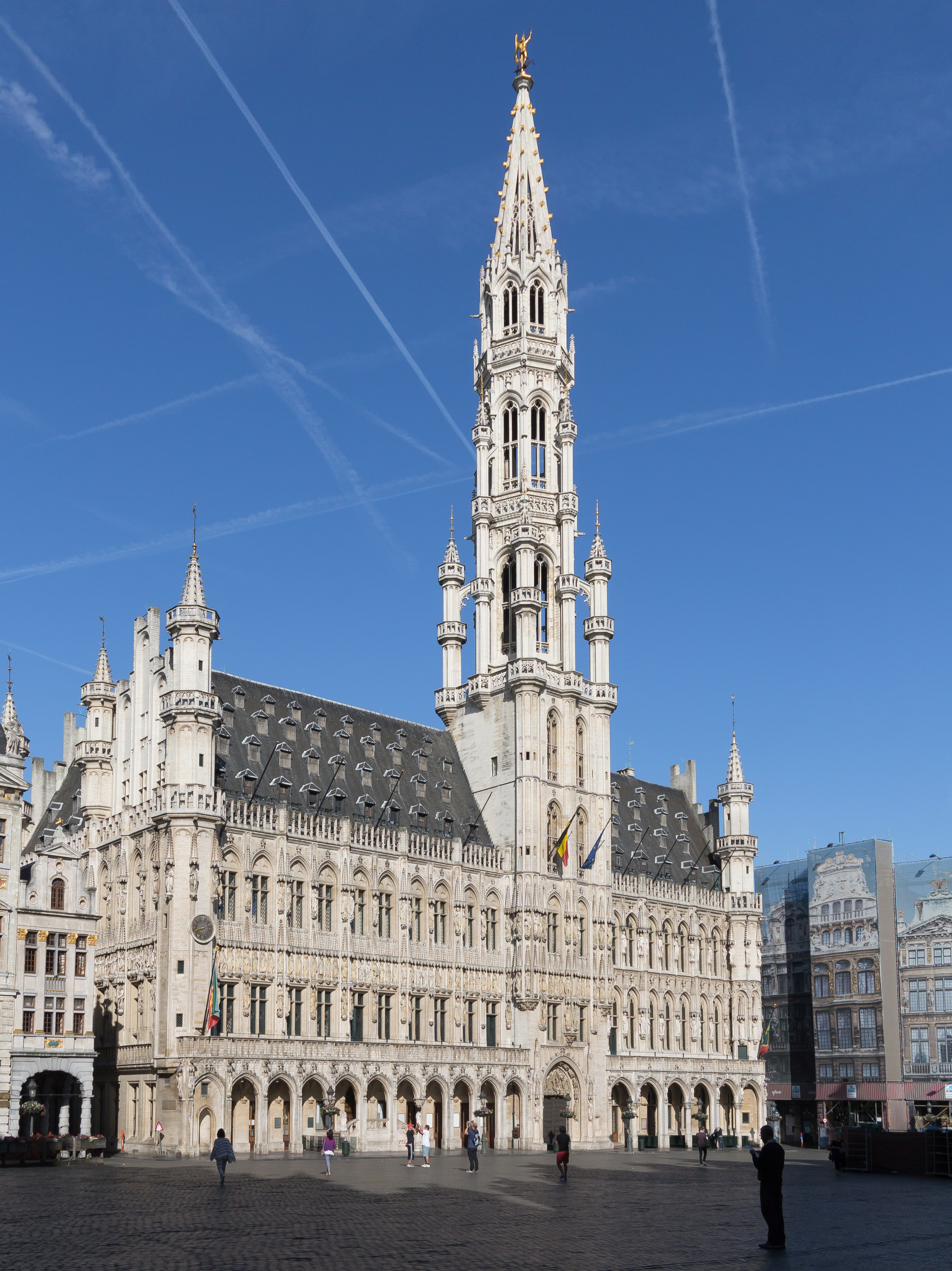
Brussels' Town Hall (15th century)

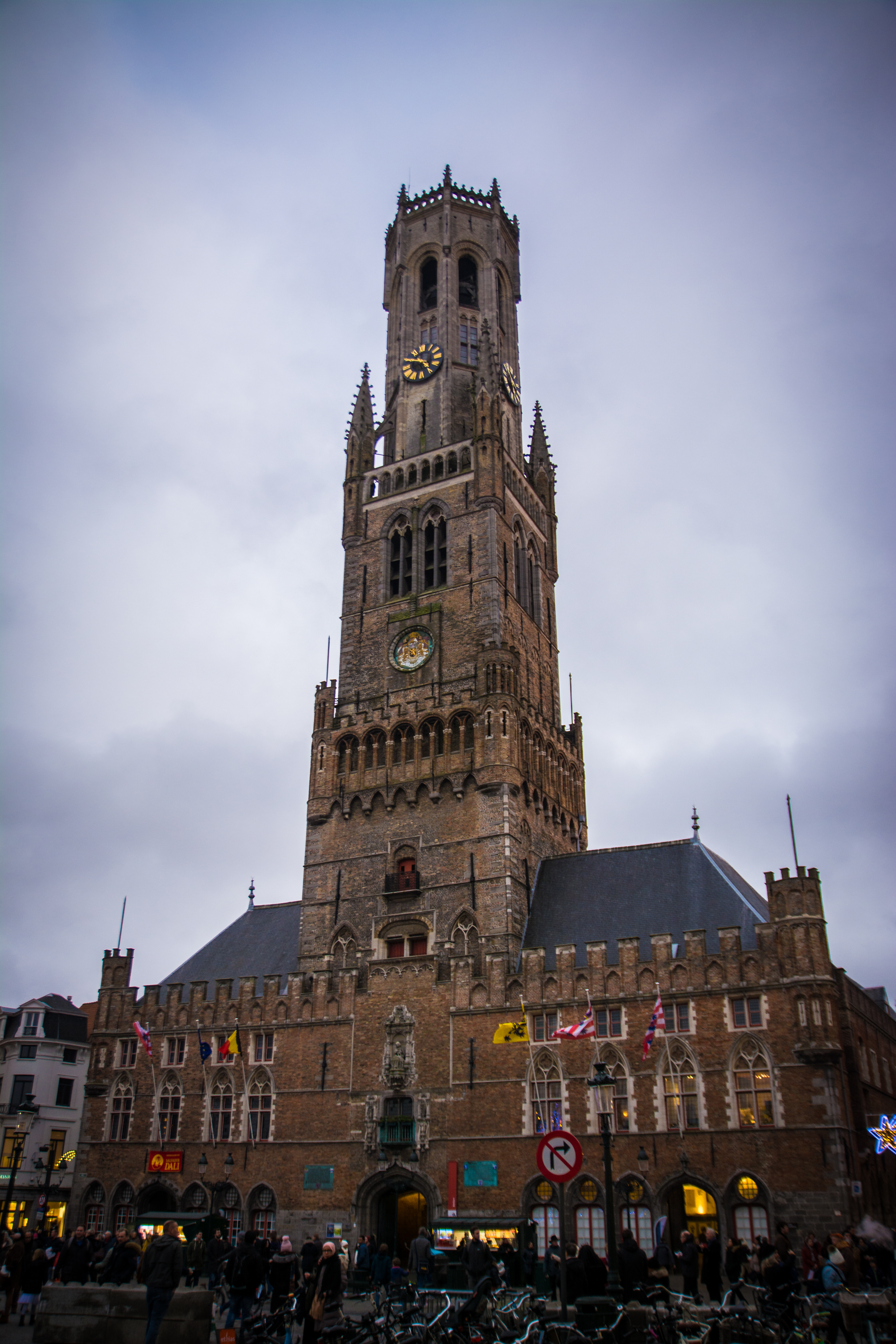
Belfry of Bruges in Bruges, Belgium (13th c. (lower stages), 15th c. (upper stages)

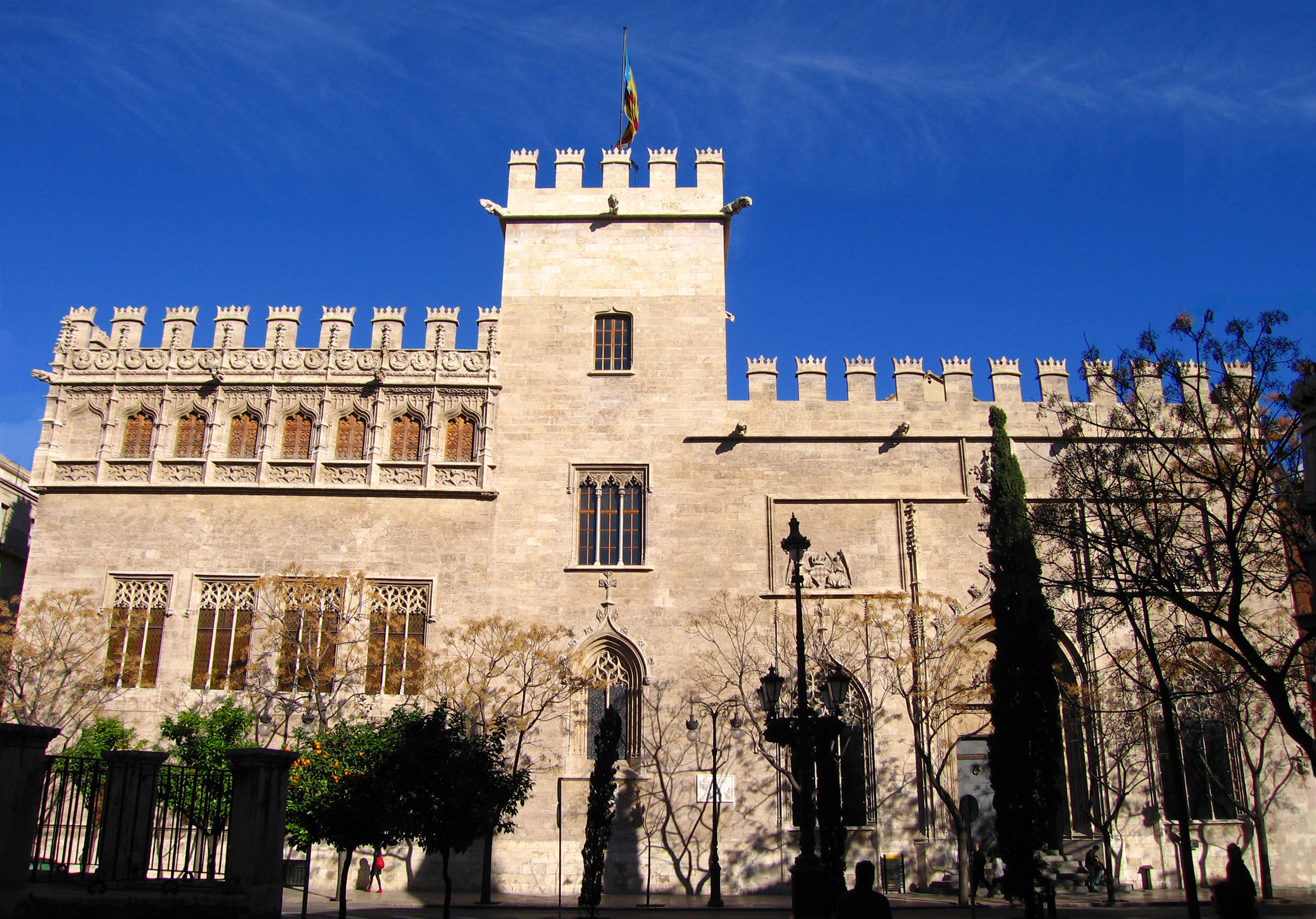
Silk Exchange, Valencia (1482–1548)

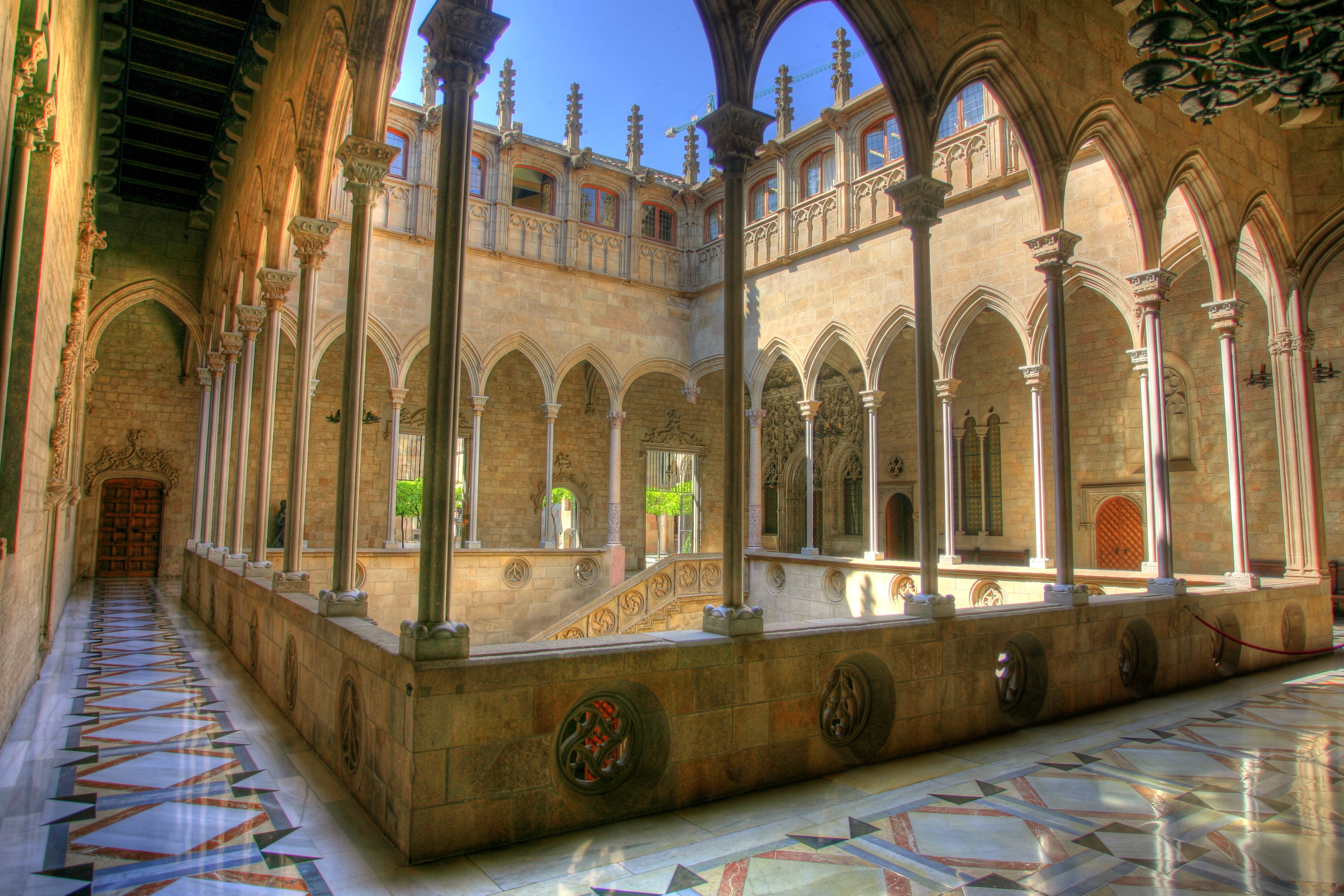
Gallery of Palau de la Generalitat, Barcelona (1403)

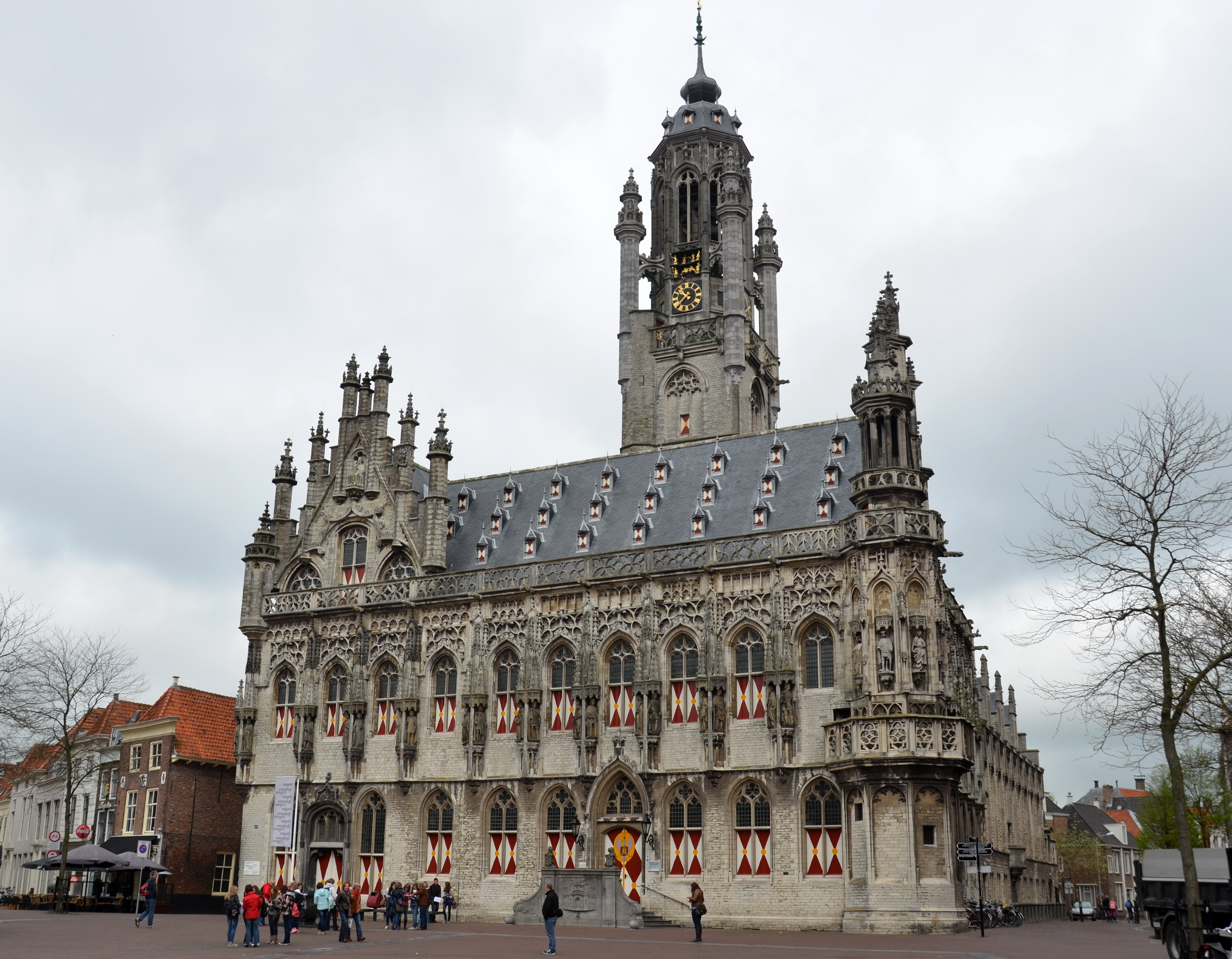
Middelburg Town Hall, Netherlands (1520)

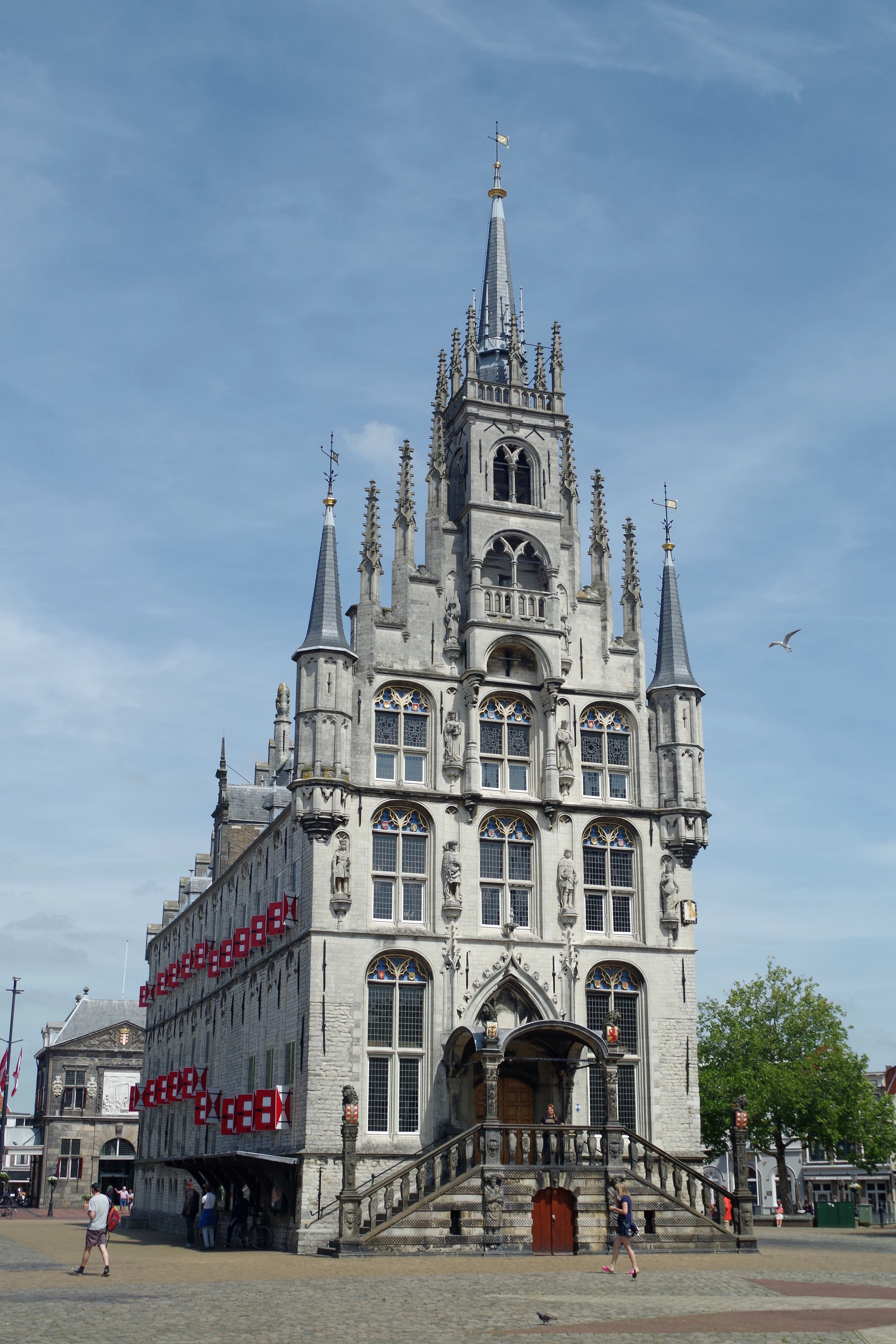
Town Hall Gouda, Netherlands (1459)

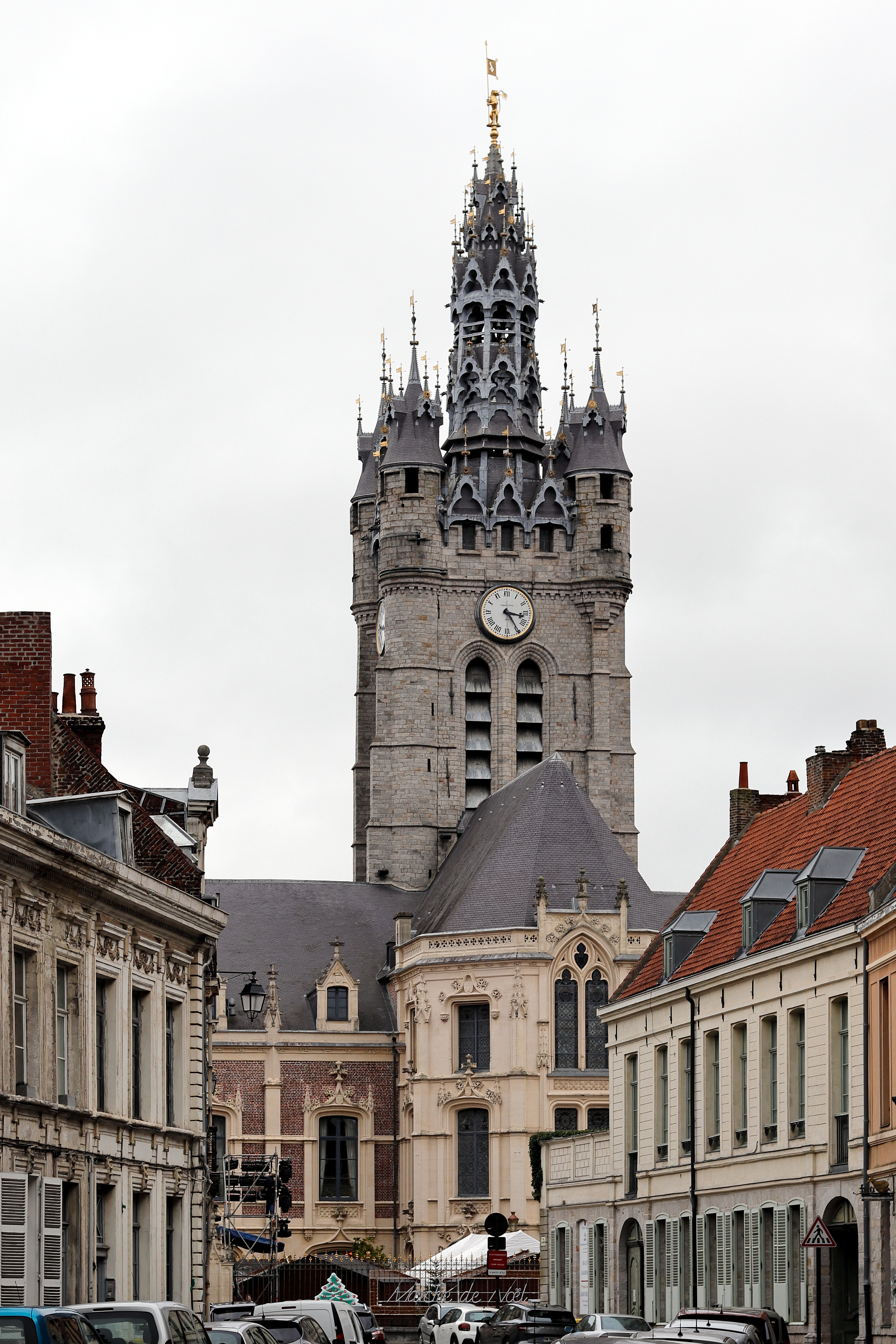
Bell tower of the Hotel de Ville of Douai, France (14th c.)

=== Educational architecture ===
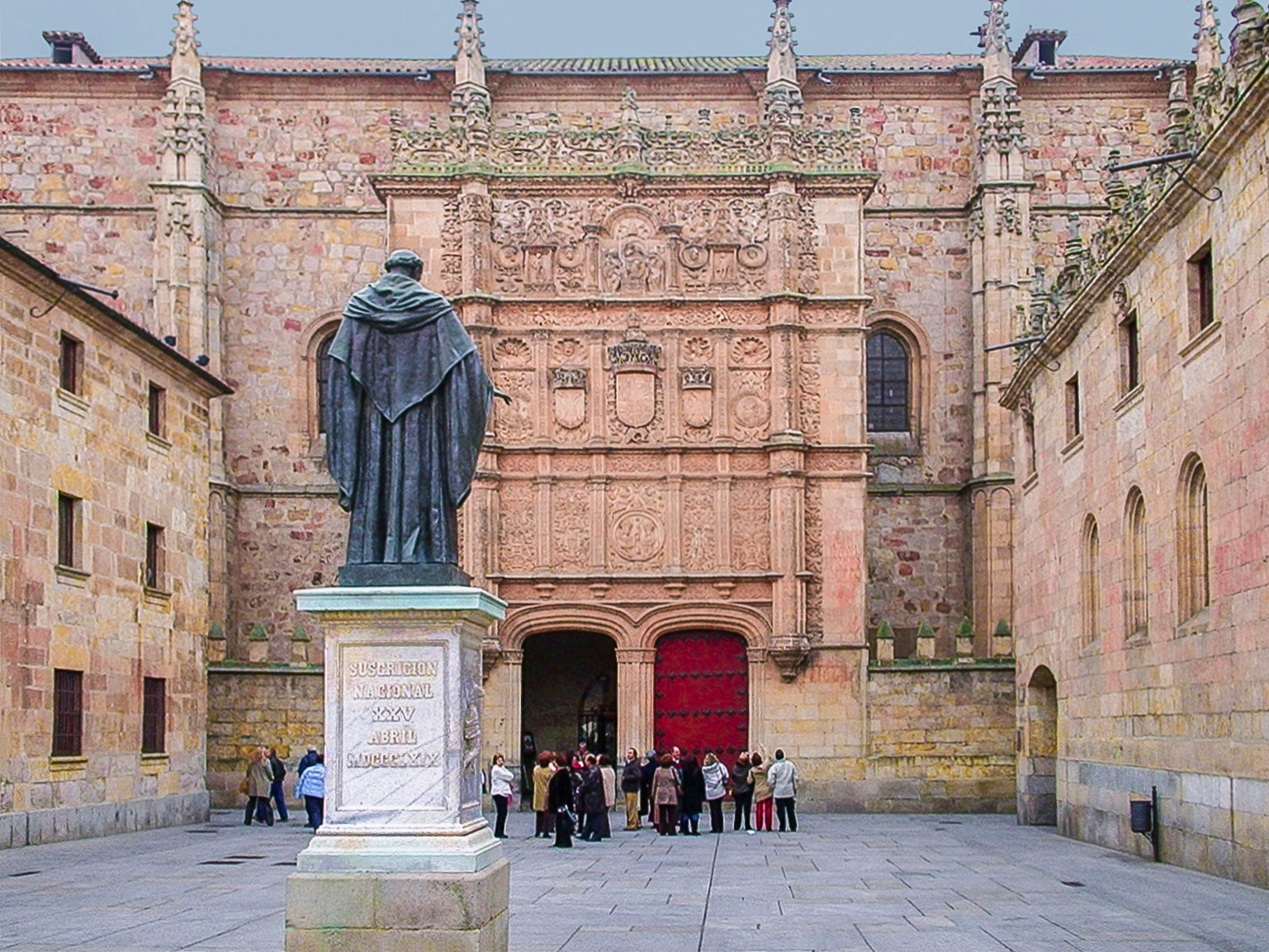
Plateresque façade, University of Salamanca (late 15th century)

In England, university students initially lived in converted houses or hostels, but from the 13th century they began to be organised in colleges, with dedicated Gothic buildings derived from the rectangular cloisters and courtyards of monasteries and manor houses. The oldest existing example in England is probably Mob Quad of Merton College at Oxford University, constructed between 1288 and 1378. Some colleges, like Balliol College, Oxford, used crenellations to evoke military architecture.

The standard English arrangement was developed by William of Wykeham, Chancellor of England and founder of Winchester College and New College, Oxford, in 1379. His architect, William Wynford, designed the New College quadrangle in the 1380s, which combined a hall, chapel, library, and residences for Fellows and undergraduates. A similar kind of academic cloister was created at Queens' College, Cambridge in the 1440s, possibly designed by Reginald Ely. The grandest English college would have been King's College, Cambridge (founded 1441), but the Wars of the Roses interfered in its construction, so only the spectacular Perpendicular chapel was built (1448-1515), with fan vaults designed by John Wastell. The same arrangements were used for schools, like Winchester College and Eton College, as for university colleges. The later Middle Ages saw the creation of specialised academic buildings, especially the pendant-vaulted Divinity School in Oxford (1427–83).

Other European examples include Collegio di Spagna in the University of Bologna, built during the 14th and 15th centuries; the Collegium Carolinum of the Charles University in Prague in the Czech Republic (c. 1400); the Escuelas mayores of the University of Salamanca in Spain; and the Collegium Maius of the Jagiellonian University in Kraków, Poland.

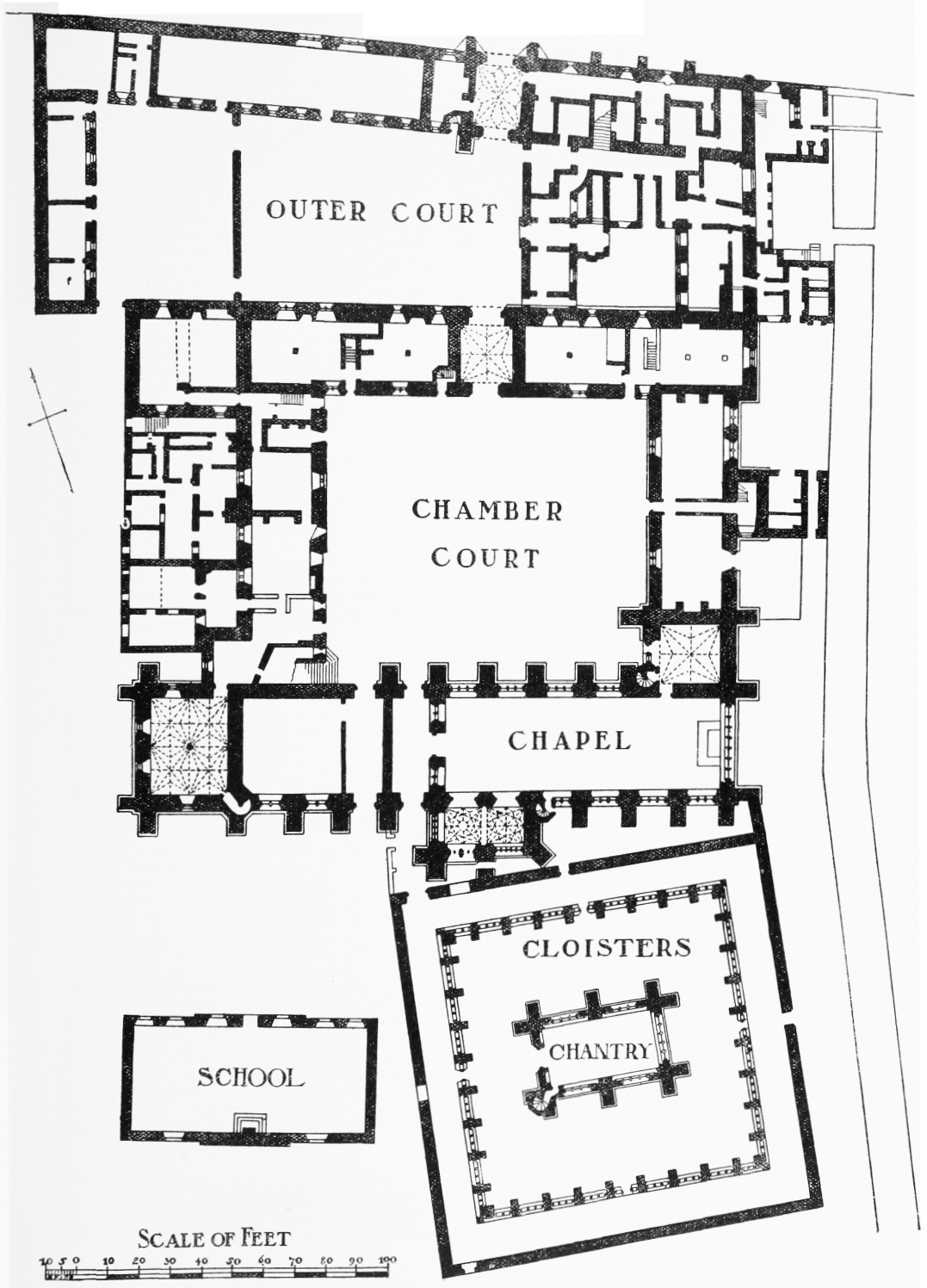
Plan of Winchester College, showing the quad, hall, chapel and cloister.

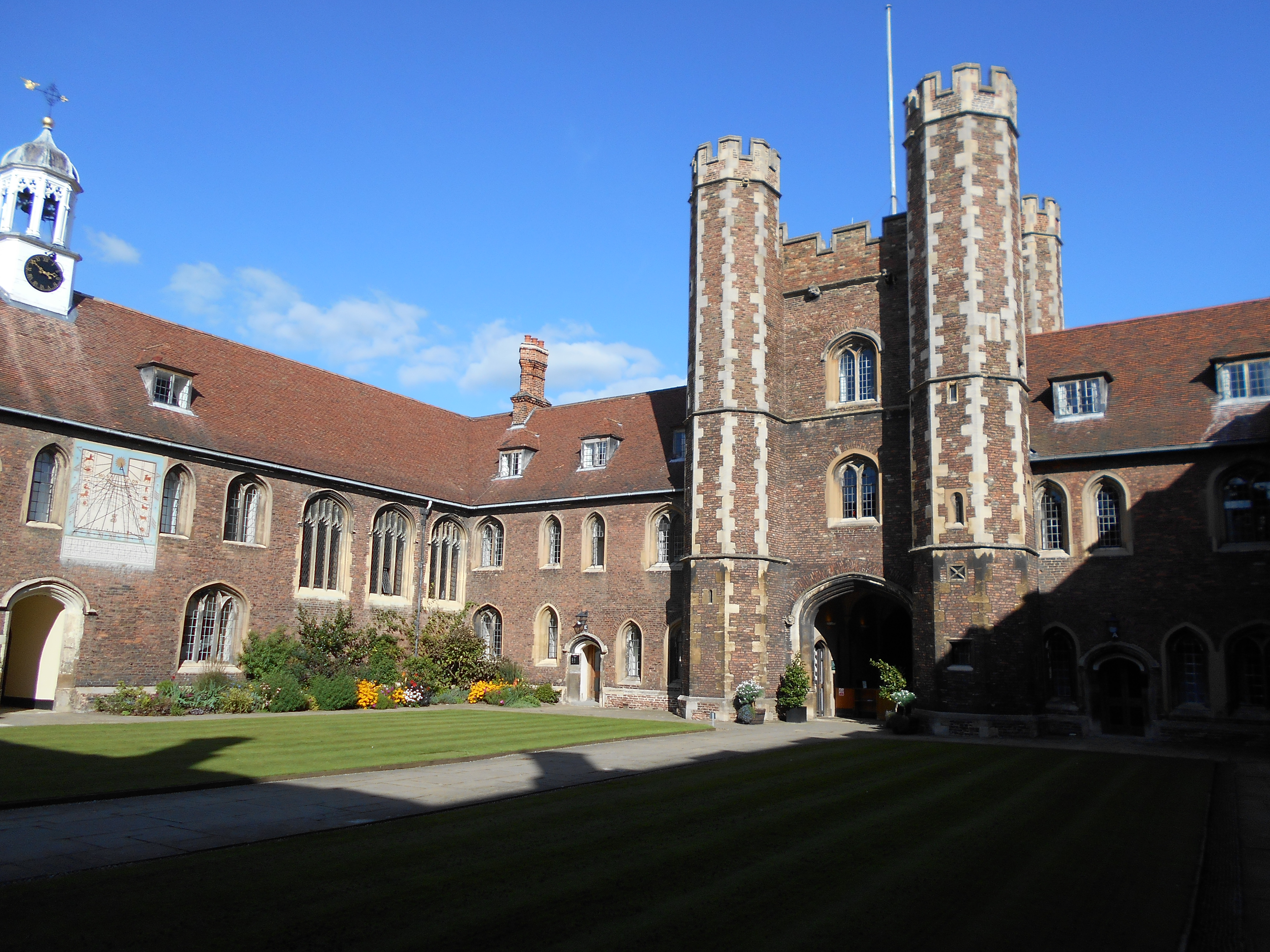
Queens' College, Cambridge, showing the chapel (left) and gatehouse (right)

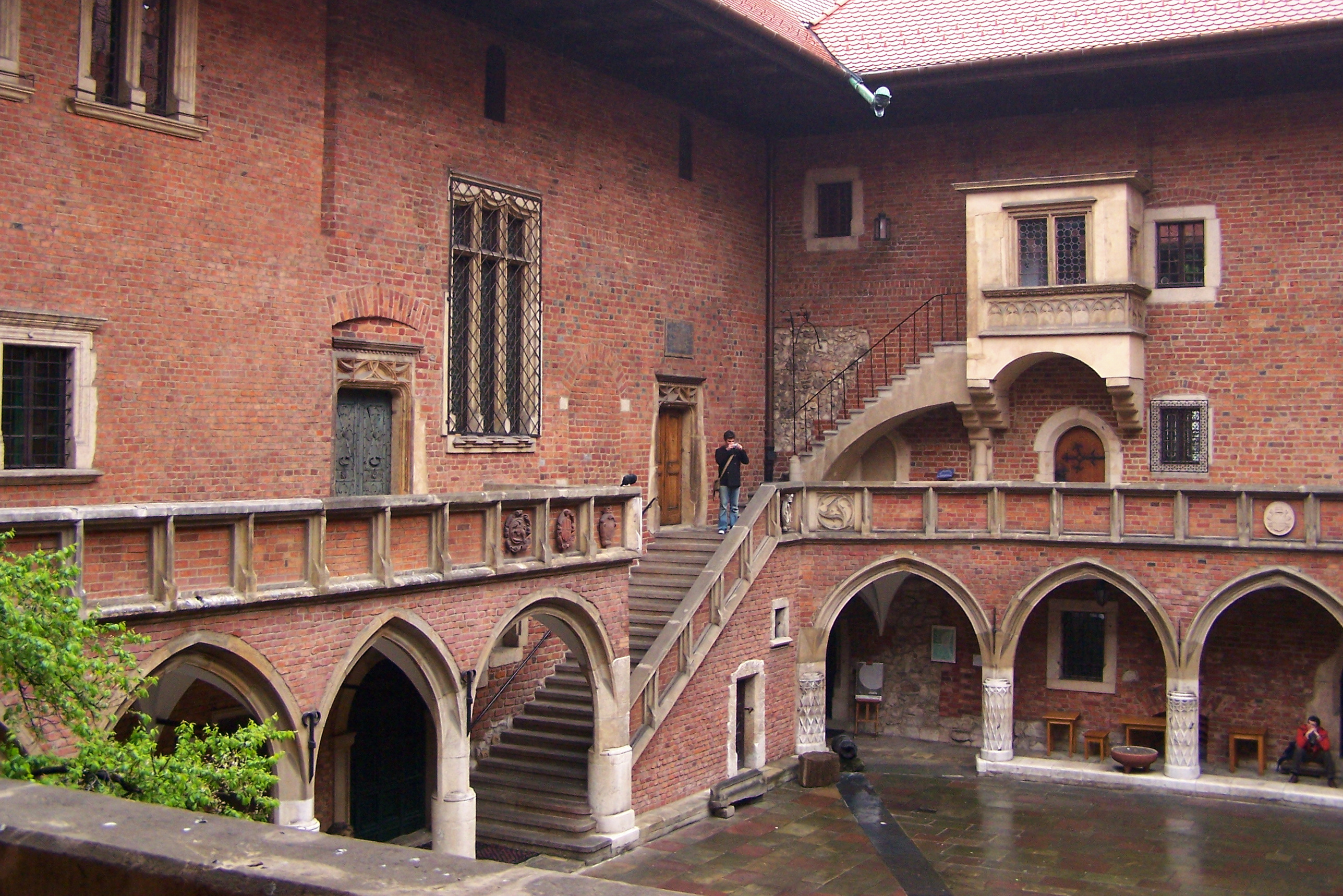
Cloister, Collegium Maius, Kraków (late 15th century)

=== Military architecture ===
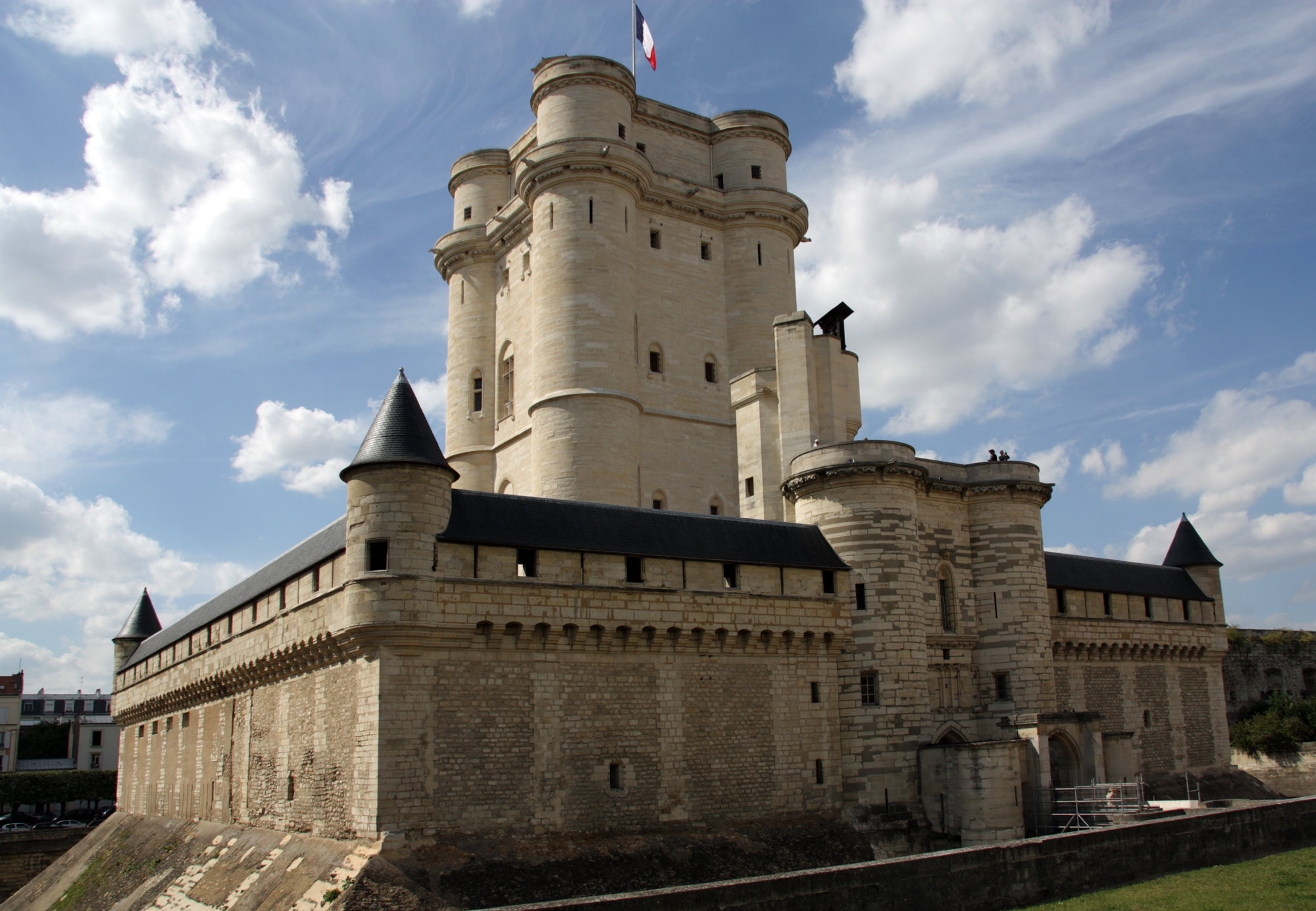
Donjon of the Château de Vincennes, (1337–)

In the 13th century, the design of the castle evolved in response to contact with the more sophisticated fortifications of the Byzantine Empire and the Islamic world during the Crusades. These new fortifications were more geometric, with a central high tower called a keep (French: donjon) which could be defended even if the curtain walls of the castle were breached. The donjon of the Château de Vincennes, begun by Philip VI of France was a good example. It was 52 m (171 ft) high, and, even though within the moat and walls of the fortress, had its own separate drawbridge to going to higher floors.

Towers, usually round, were placed at the corners and along the walls in the Phillipienne castle, close enough together to support each other. The walls had two levels of walkways on the inside, a crenellated parapet with merlons, and projecting machicolations from which missiles could be dropped on besiegers. The upper walls also had protected protruding balconies, bartizans and bretèches, from which soldiers could see what was happening at the corners or on the ground below. In addition, the towers and walls were pierced with arrowslits, which sometimes took the form of crosses to enable a wider field of fire for archers and crossbowmen.

Many castles were surrounded by moat, often spanned by a drawbridge. The entrance was also protected by a portcullis. The walls at the bottom were often sloping, and protected with earthen barriers. One good surviving example is the Château de Dourdan, near Nemours.

After the end of the Hundred Years War (1337–1453), with improvements in artillery, the castles lost most of their military importance. They remained as symbols of the rank of their noble occupants; the narrow openings in the walls were often widened into the windows of bedchambers and ceremonial halls. The tower of the Château de Vincennes became a part-time royal residence until the Palace of Versailles was completed.

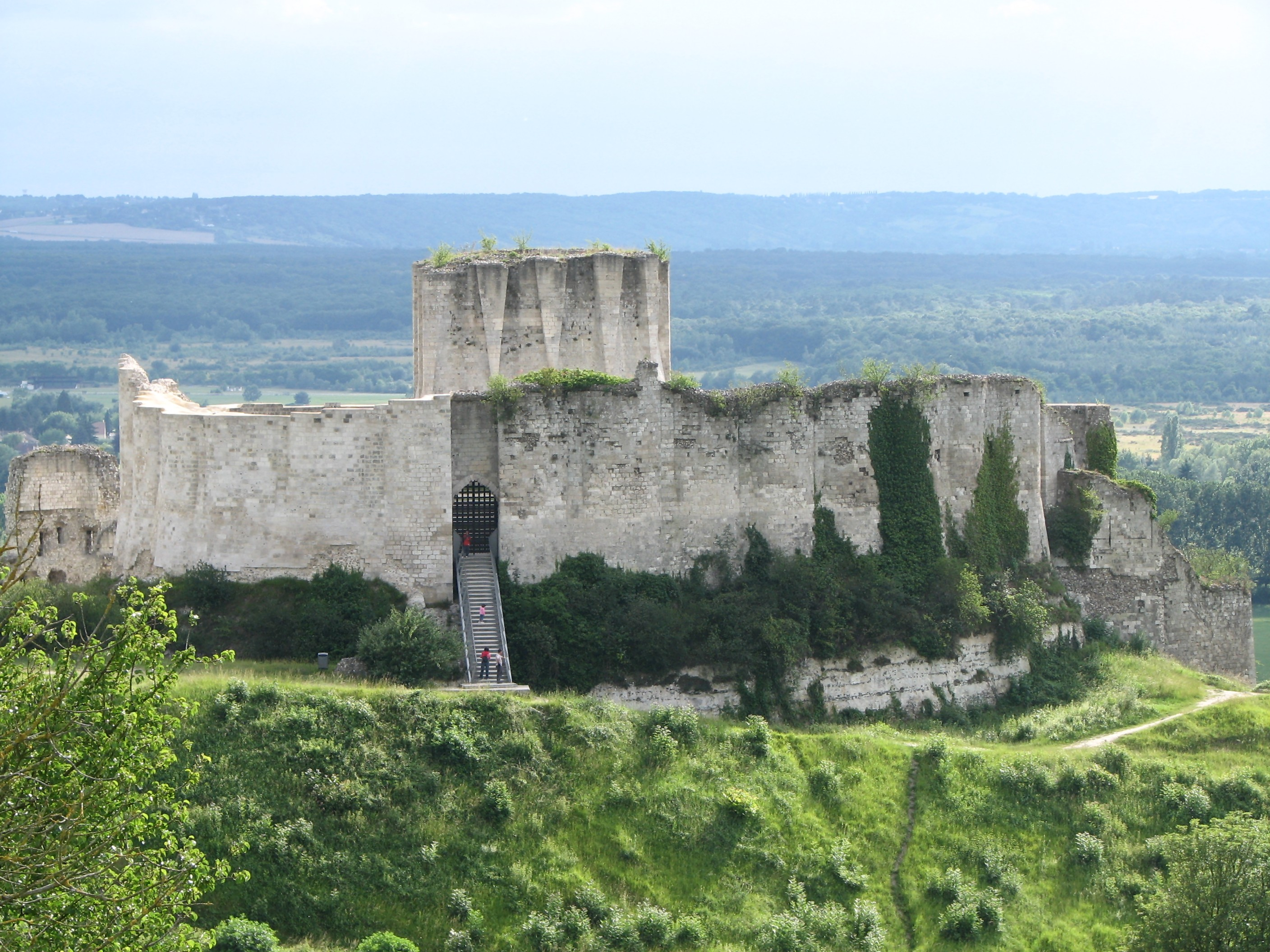
Château Gaillard, France (1196–98)

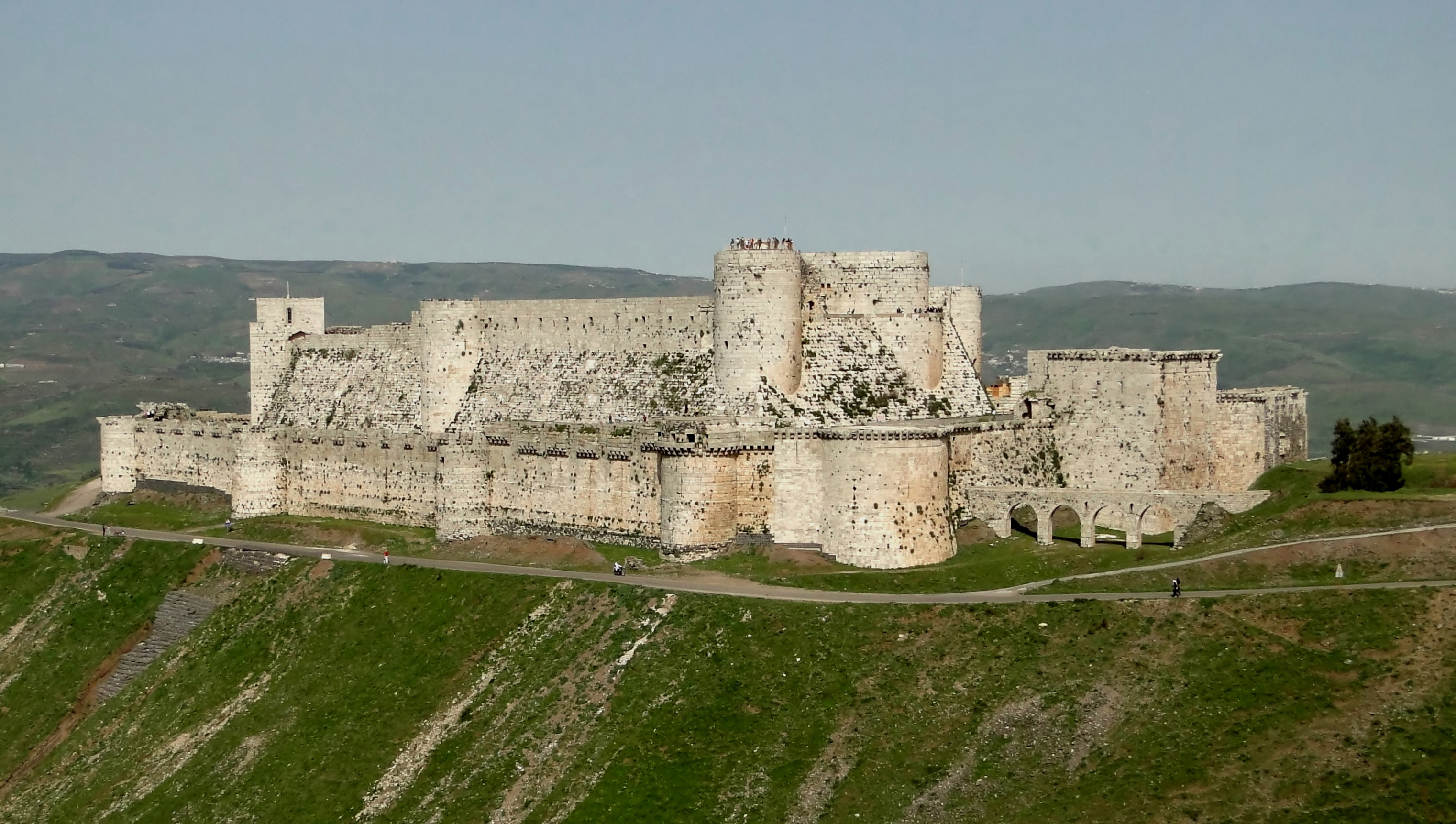
The concentric Krak des Chevaliers, Syria (12th-13th centuries)

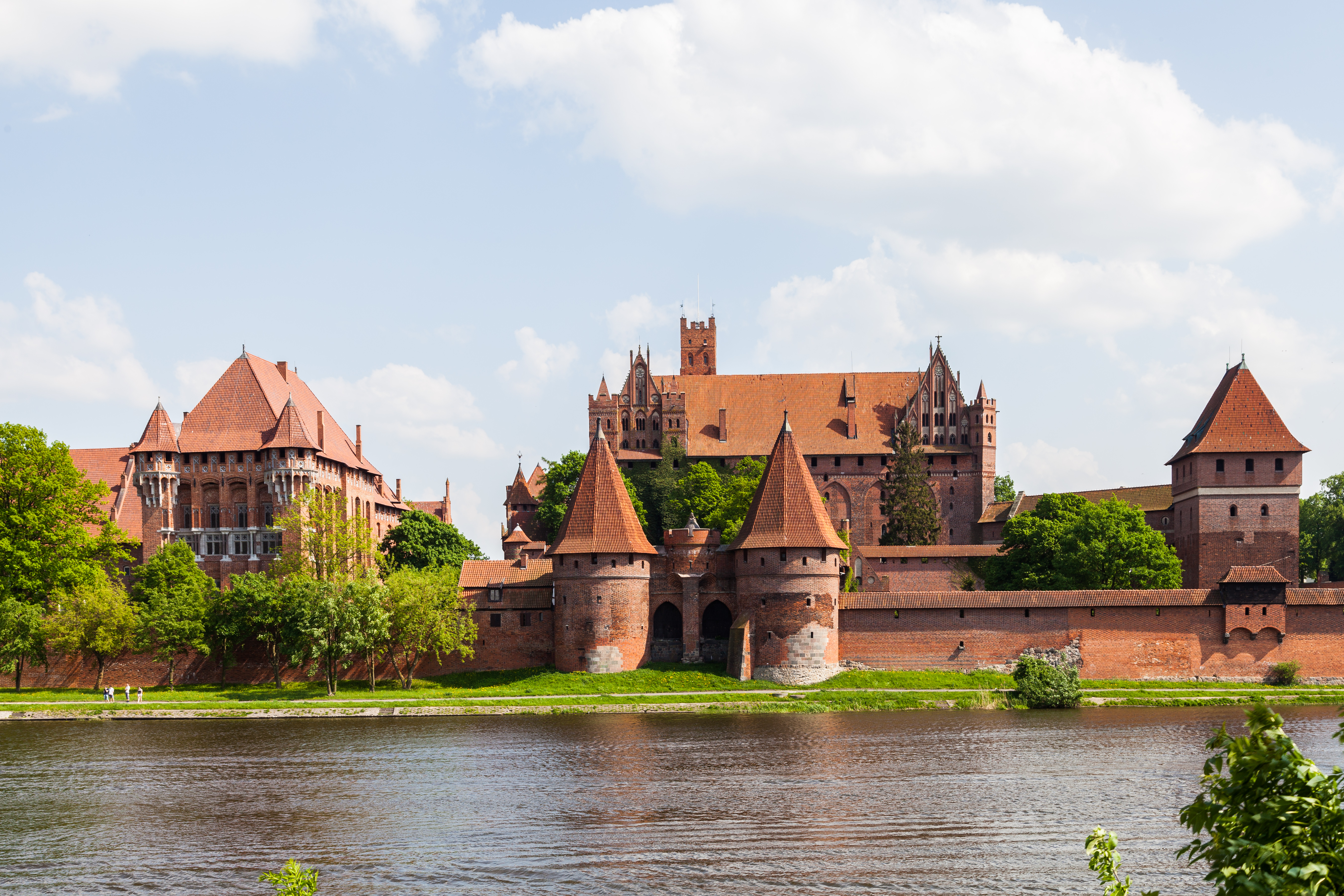
Malbork Castle in Poland (13th-14th century)

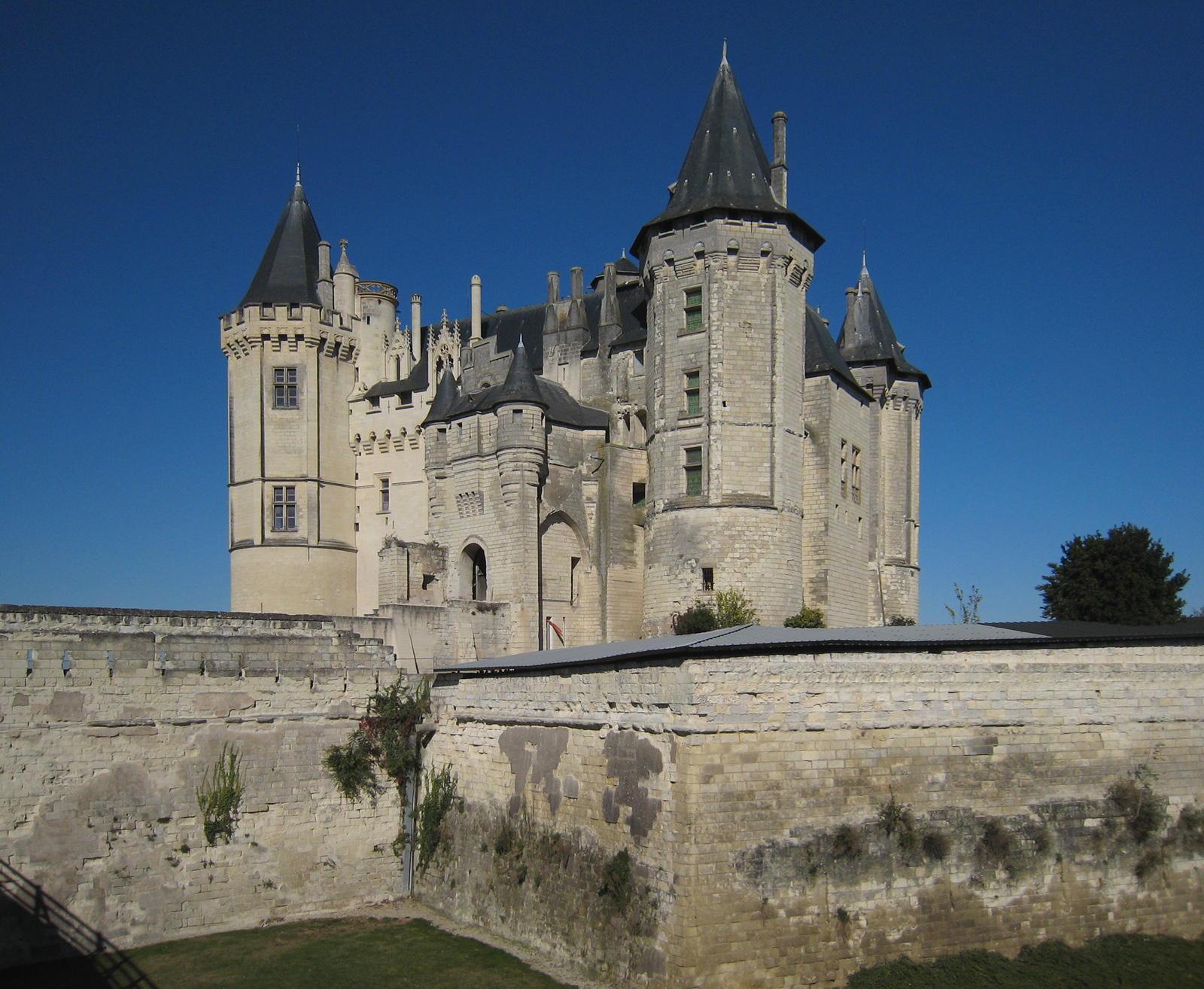
Château de Saumur, France (largely 1360s)

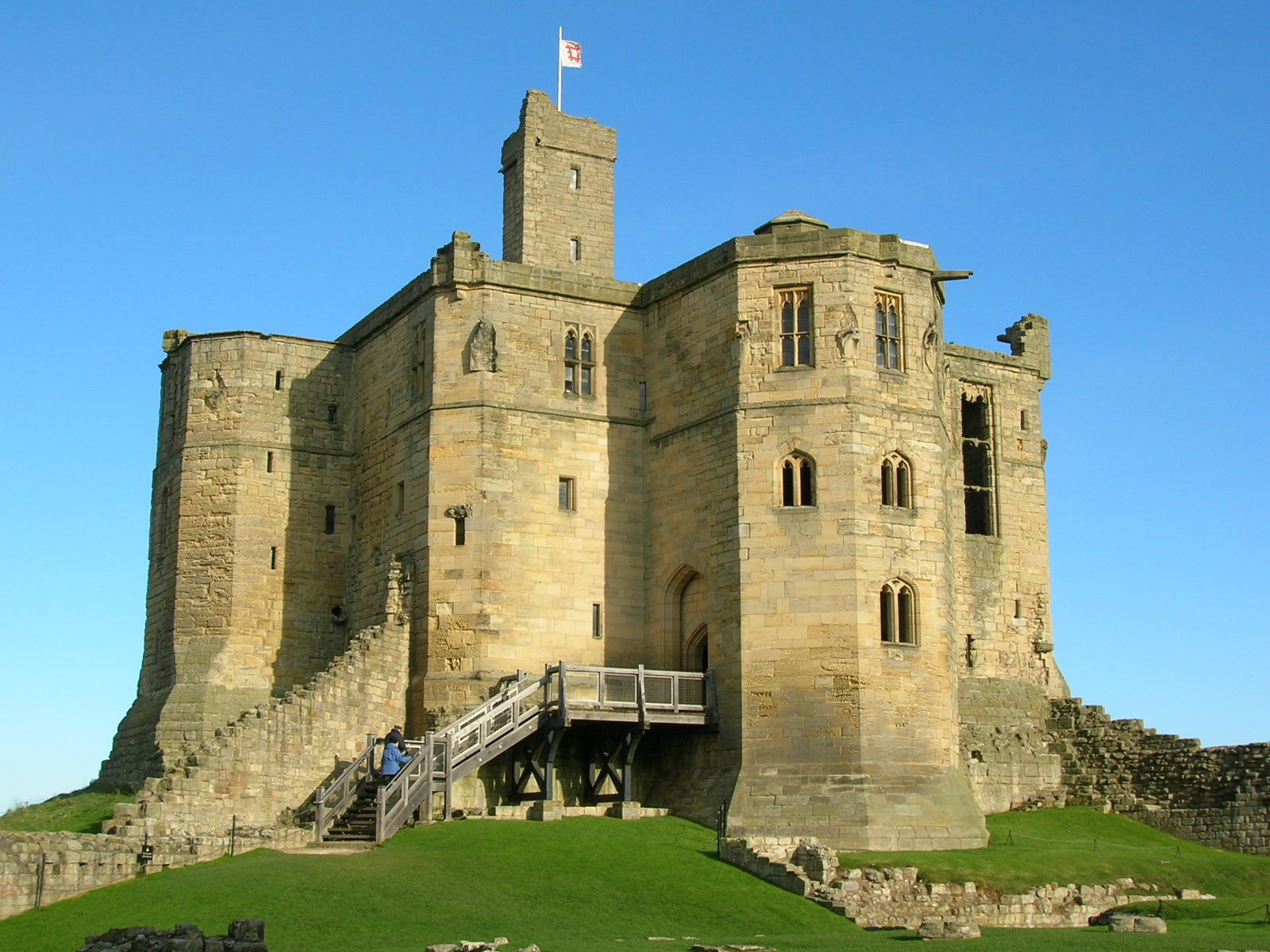
Warkworth Castle, England (late 14th century)

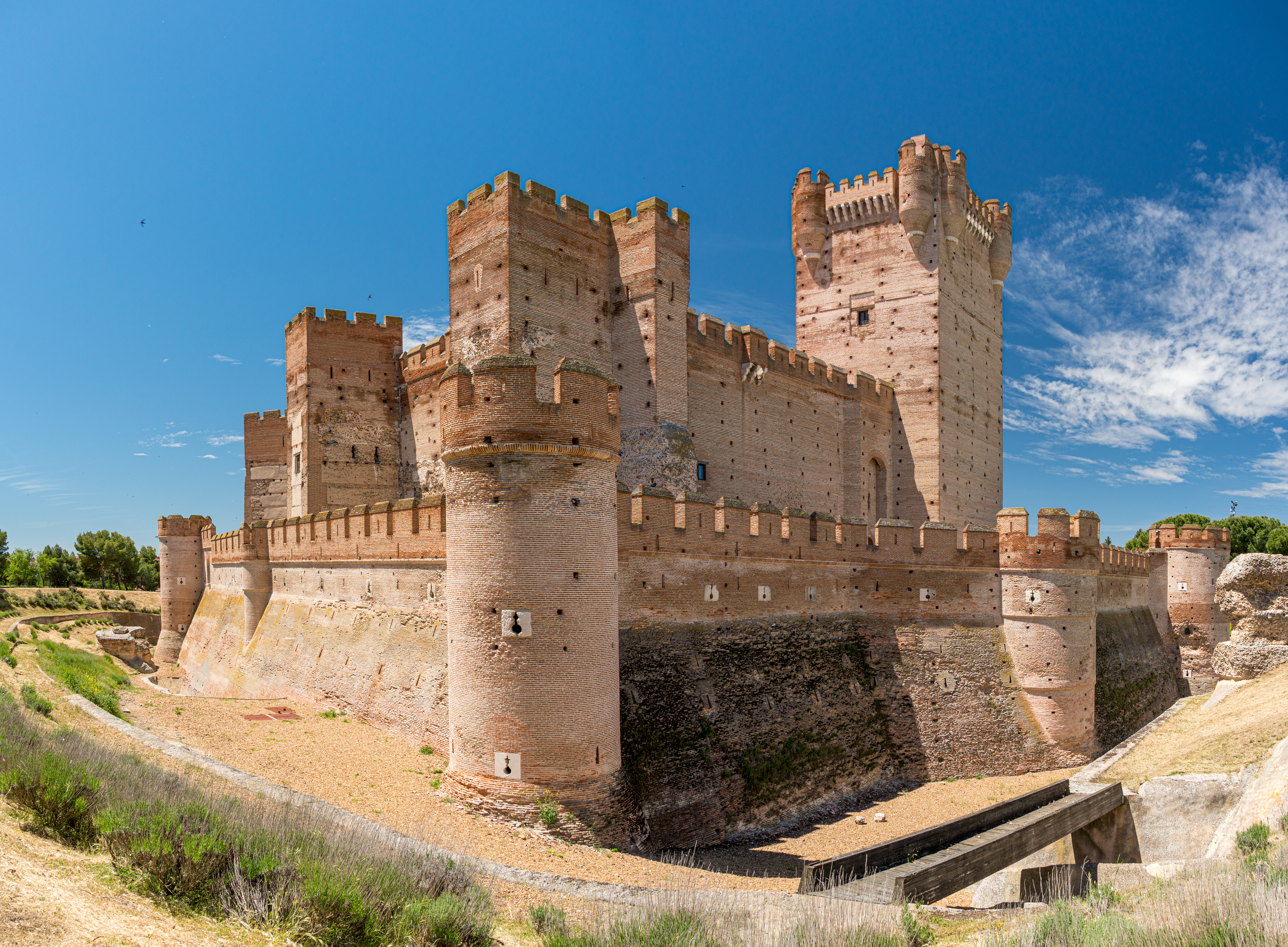
Castillo de la Mota, Spain (15th century)

== Synagogues ==
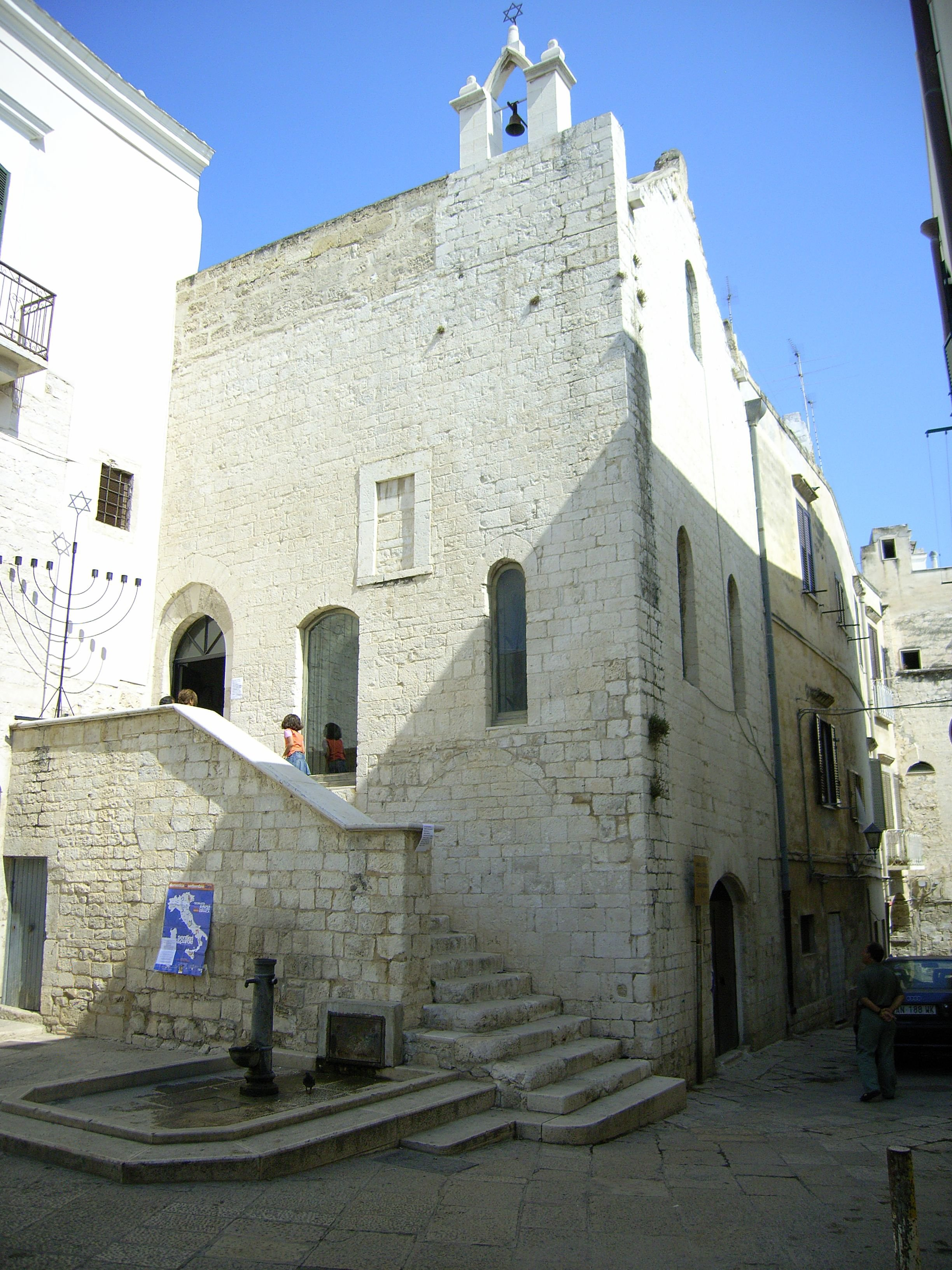
Scolanova Synagogue, Trani, Apulia (1247)

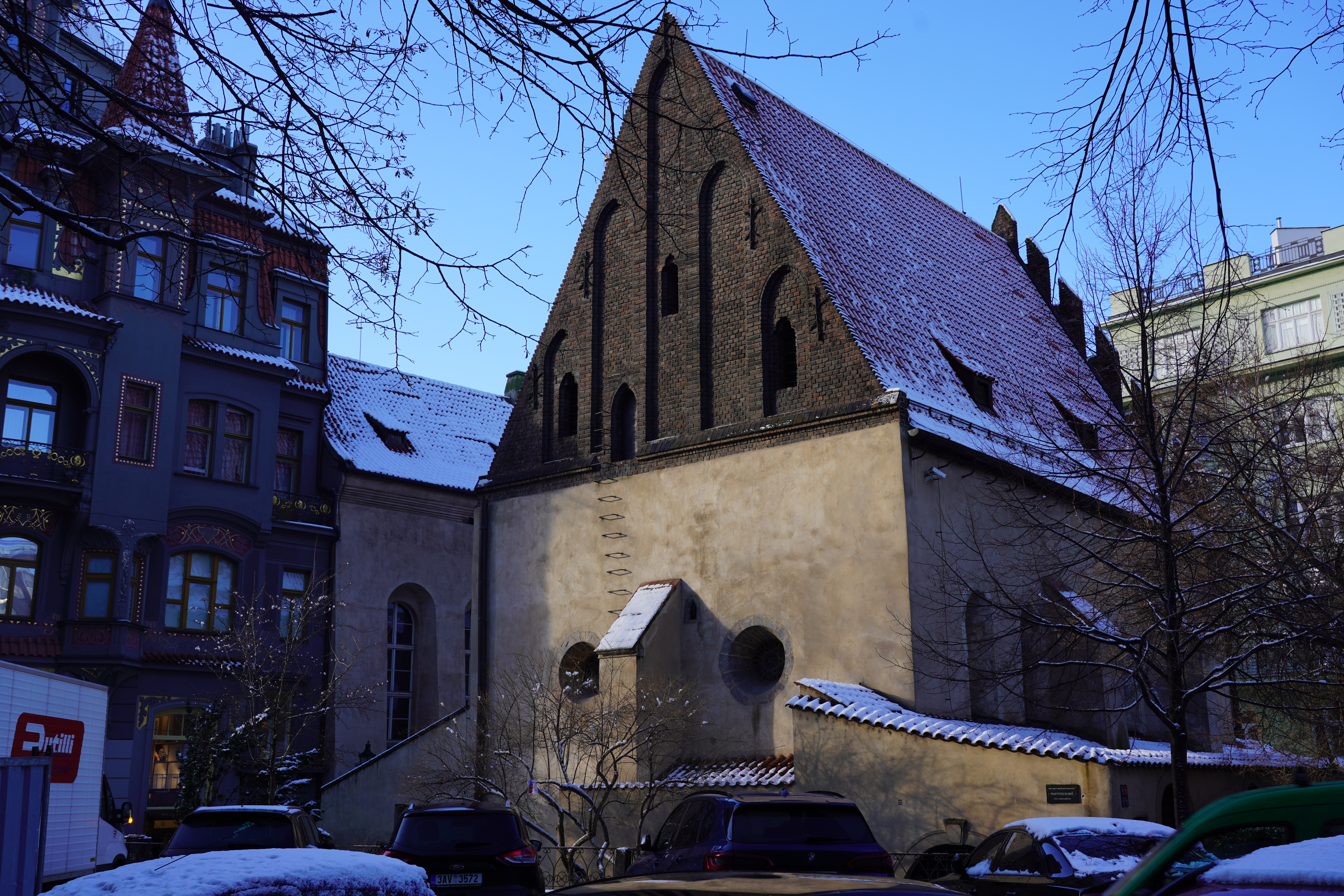
Old New Synagogue, Prague (c. 1270)

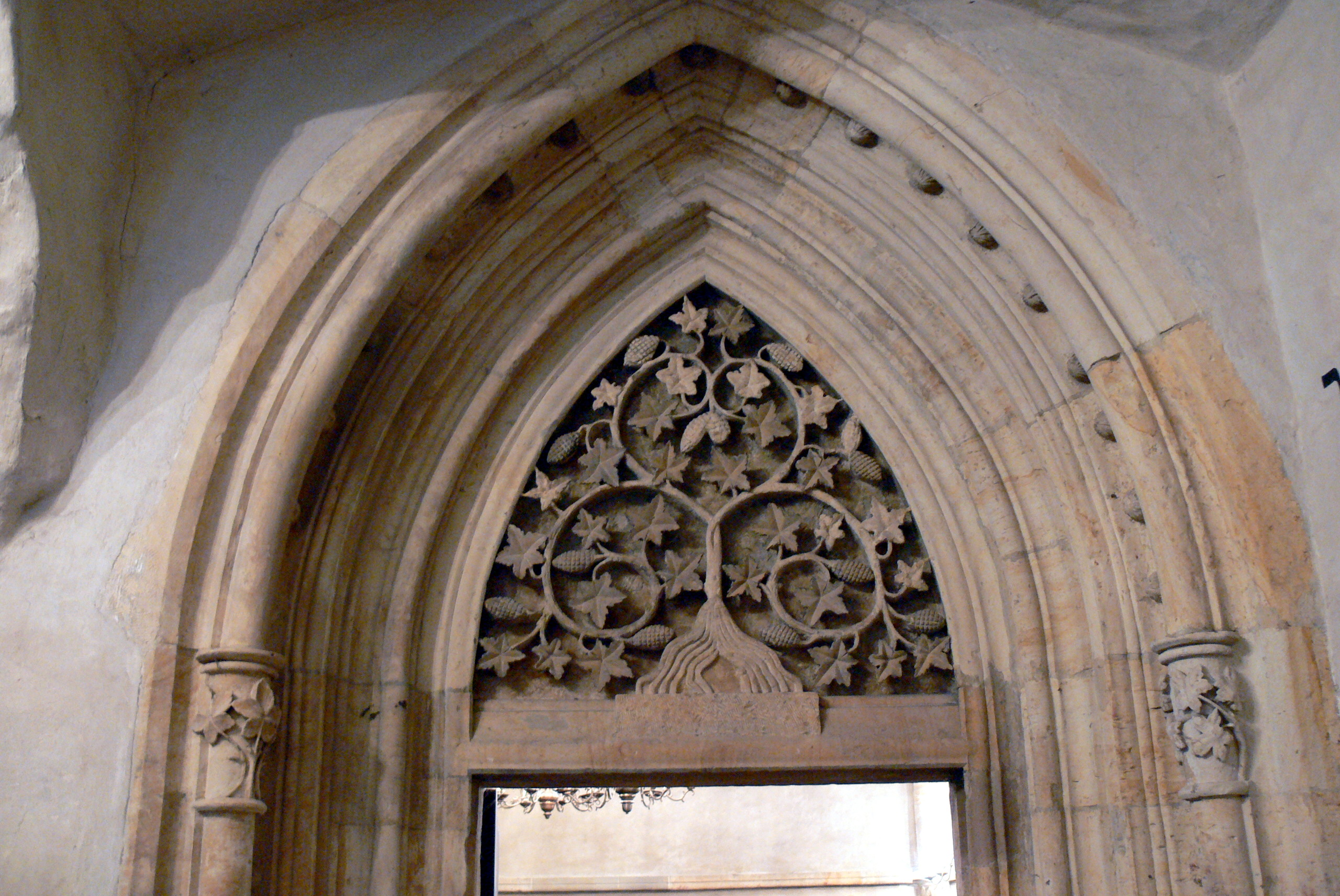
Main portal of the Old New Synagogue, Prague (c. 1270)

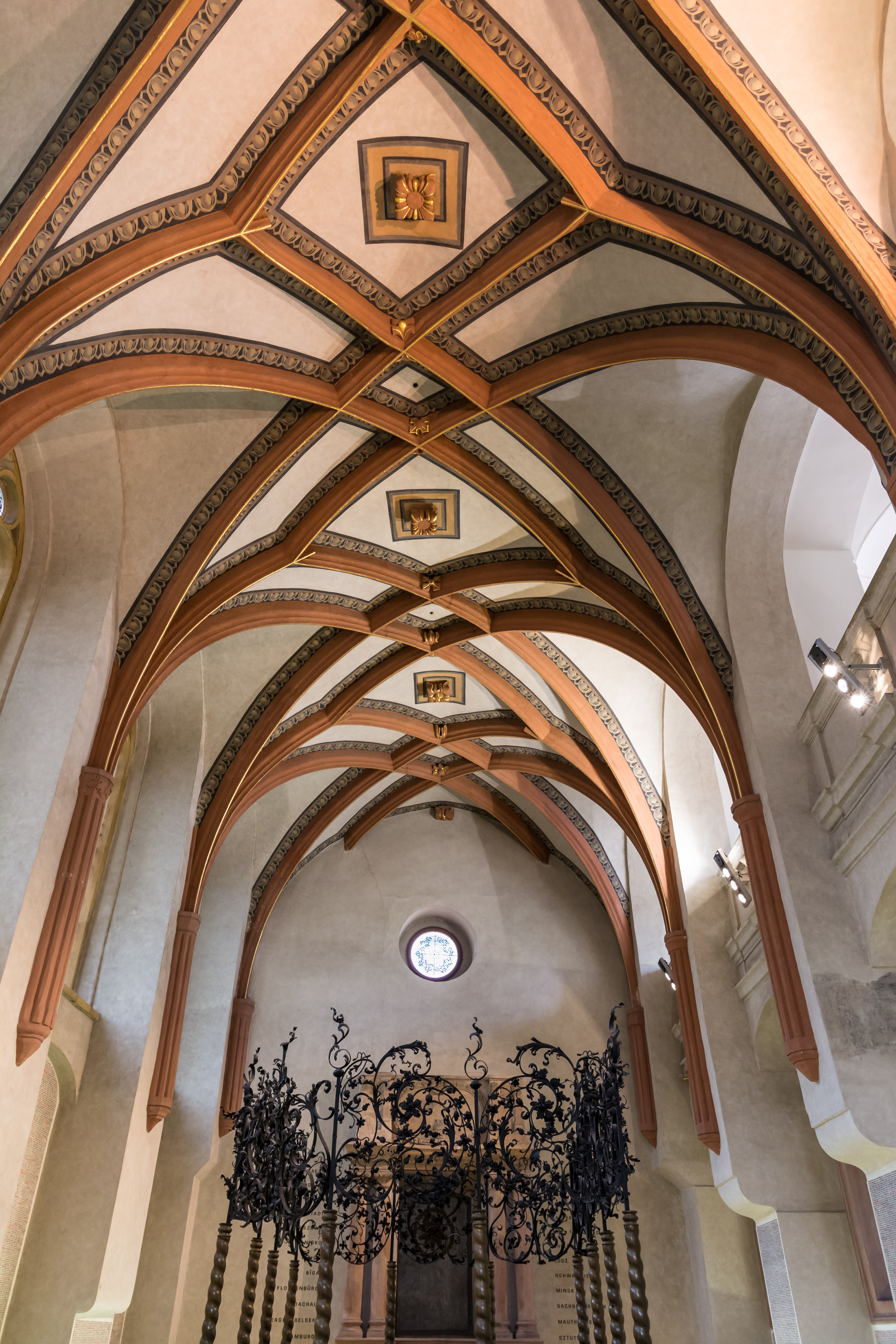
Late Gothic vaulting of Pinkas Synagogue, Prague (1535)

Although Gothic was primarily a Christian style, Jewish communities were present in many European cities during the Middle Ages and they also built their places of worship in the Gothic style. Few Gothic synagogues have survived, because they were often destroyed in connection with persecution of the Jews (e. g. in Bamberg, Nürnberg, Regensburg, Vienna). An exception is the Old New Synagogue in Prague, which was completed around 1270.

== Subvarieties ==
=== Styles ===
- Early Gothic
  - Romano-Gothic
- High Gothic
- Rayonnant
- Flamboyant
- Neo-Gothic

==== Northern styles ====
- French Gothic
  - Classic Gothic
  - Southern French Gothic
  - Plantagenet style
- English Gothic
  - Early English Gothic
  - Decorated Gothic
  - Perpendicular Gothic
- Low Country Gothic
  - Scheldt Gothic
  - Mosan Gothic
  - Brabantine Gothic
- Czech Gothic
- Sondergotik
- Lithuanian Gothic
  - Belarusian Gothic
- Polish Gothic

==== Mediterranean styles ====
- Portuguese Gothic
  - Manueline
- Spanish Gothic
  - Levantine Gothic
  - Valencian Gothic
  - Catalan Gothic
  - Isabelline
  - Plateresque
- Italian Gothic

=== Types ===
- Brick Gothic
- Jettied buildings
- Gothic ecclesiastic architecture
  - Architecture of the medieval cathedrals of England
- Gothic secular architecture
  - Military

== See also ==
- Architectural history
- Architecture of cathedrals and great churches
- Carpenter Gothic
- Collegiate Gothic in North America
- Gothicmed
- Gothic cathedrals and churches
- List of Gothic architecture
- Mudéjar
- Tented roof

== Bibliography ==
- Alonso, R. (1997). "Etapa románica y gótica de la catedral de Oviedo". In Ruiz de la Peña, J. I. (ed.). El libro de la catedral de Oviedo: escrito en la piedra. Oviedo: Paraíso.
- Bechmann, Roland (2017). Les Racines des Cathédrales (in French). Payot. ISBN 978-2-228-90651-7.
- Burton, Janet B.; Kerr, Julie (2011). The Cistercians in the Middle Ages. Monastic orders. Vol. 4 (Illustrated ed.). Boydell Press. ISBN 9781843836674.
- Bony, Jean (1983). French Gothic Architecture of the Twelfth and Thirteenth Centuries. University of California Press. ISBN 978-0-520-02831-9.
- Chastel, André (2000). L'Art Français Pré-Moyen Âge Moyen Âge (in French). Paris: Flammarion. ISBN 2-08-012298-3.
- Ching, Francis D.K. (2012). A Visual Dictionary of Architecture (2nd ed.). John Wiley & Sons, Inc. ISBN 978-0-470-64885-8.
- Clark, W. W.; King, R. (1983). Laon Cathedral, Architecture. Courtauld Institute Illustration Archives. 1. London: Harvey Miller Publishers. ISBN 9780905203553.
- Der Manuelian, Lucy (2001). "Ani: The Fabled Capital of Armenia". In Cowe, S. Peter (ed.). Ani: World Architectural Heritage of a Medieval Armenian Capital. Leuven Sterling. ISBN 978-90-429-1038-6.
- Draper, Peter (2005). "Islam and the West: The Early Use of the Pointed Arch Revisited". Architectural History. 5: 1–20. doi:10.1017/S0066622X00003701. ISSN 0066-622X. JSTOR 40033831. S2CID 194947480.
- Ducher, Robert (1988). Caractéristique des Styles (in French). Flammarion. ISBN 978-2-08-011539-3.
- Ducher, Robert (2014). Caractéristique des Styles (in French). Flammarion. ISBN 978-2-0813-4383-2.
- Fiske, Kimball (1943). The Creation of the Rococo. Philadelphia Museum of Art.
- Fletcher, Banister (2001). A History of Architecture on the Comparative Method. Elsevier Science & Technology. ISBN 978-0-7506-2267-7.
- Garsoïan, Nina G. (2015). "Sirarpie Der Nersessian (1896–1989)". In Damico, Helen (ed.). Medieval Scholarship: Biographical Studies on the Formation of a Discipline: Religion and Art. Routledge. ISBN 978-1-317-77636-9.
- Giese, Francine; Pawlak, Anna; Thome, Markus (2018). Tomb – Memory – Space: Concepts of Representation in Premodern Christian and Islamic Art (in German). Walter de Gruyter GmbH & Co KG. ISBN 9783110517347.
- Grodecki, Louis (1977). Nervi, Luigi (ed.). Gothic Architecture. In collaboration with Anne Prache and Roland Recht, translated from French by I. Mark Paris. Abrams Books. ISBN 978-0-8109-1008-9.
- Harvey, John (1950). The Gothic World, 1100–1600. Batsford.
- Harvey, John (1974). Châteaux et Cathédrals-L'Art des Batisseurs, L'Encyclopedie de la Civilisation (in French). London: Thames and Hudson.
- Hughes, William; Punter, David; Smith, Andrew (2015). The Encyclopedia of the Gothic. John Wiley & Sons. ISBN 9781119210412.
- Jones, Colin (1999). The Cambridge Illustrated History of France. Cambridge University Press. ISBN 978-0-521-66992-4.
- Lang, David Marshall (1980). Armenia: Cradle of Civilization. Allen & Unwin.
- Martin, G. H.; Highfield, J. R. L. (1997). A history of Merton College, Oxford. Oxford: Oxford University Press. ISBN 0-19-920183-8.
- Martindale, Andrew (1993). Gothic Art. Thames and Hudson. ISBN 978-2-87811-058-6.
- McNamara, Denis (2017). Comprendre l'Art des Églises (in French). Larousse. ISBN 978-2-03-589952-1.
- Mignon, Olivier (2017). Architecture du Patrimoine Française - Abbayes, Églises, Cathédrales et Châteaux (in French). Éditions Ouest-France. ISBN 978-27373-7611-5.
- Mignon, Olivier (2015). Architecture des Cathédrales Gothiques (in French). Éditions Ouest-France. ISBN 978-2-7373-6535-5.
- Mitchell, Ann (1968). Cathedrals of Europe. Great Buildings of the World. Hamlyn. ASIN B0006C19ES.
- Moffat, Fazio & Wodehouse (2003). A World History of Architecture. Laurence King Publishing. ISBN 1-85669-353-8.
- Montagnon, Pierre (2016). La France des Clochers (in French). Editions Telemaque. ISBN 978-2-7533-0307-2.
- Oggins, R.O. (2000). Cathedrals. Metrobooks (Friedman/Fairfax Publishers). ISBN 9781567993462.
- Pevsner, Nikolaus (1964). An Outline of European Architecture. Pelican Books. ISBN 978-0-14-061613-2.
- Poisson, Georges; Poisson, Olivier (2014). Eugène Viollet-le-Duc (in French). Paris: Picard. ISBN 978-2-7084-0952-1.
- Raeburn, Michael (1980). "The Middle Ages". In Coldstream, Nicola (ed.). Architecture of the Western World. With a foreword by Sir Hugh Casson. Rizzoli International. ISBN 978-0-8478-0349-1.
- Renault, Christophe; Lazé, Christophe (2006). Les Styles de l'architecture et du mobilier (in French). Gisserot. ISBN 978-2-87747-465-8.
- Ovid (1851). Riley, Henry T. (ed.). The Fasti, Tristia, Pontic Epistles, Ibis, and Halieuticon of Ovid. H. G. Bohn. p. 216.
- Scott, Robert A. (2003). The Gothic enterprise: a guide to understanding the Medieval cathedral. University of California Press. ISBN 978-0-520-23177-1.
- Stewart, Cecil (1959). History of Architectural Development: Early Christian, Byzantine and Romanesque Architecture. Longman.
- Swaan, Wim (1988). The Gothic Cathedral. Omega Books. ISBN 978-0-907853-48-0.
- Rice, David Talbot (1972). The Appreciation of Byzantine Art. Oxford University Press.
- Texier, Simon (2012). Paris Panorama de l'architecture de l'Antiquité à nos jours (in French). Parigramme. ISBN 978-2-84096-667-8.
- Toman, Rolf (2007). Néoclassicisme et Romantisme. Ulmann. ISBN 978-3-8331-3557-6.
- Vasari, Giorgio (1907). Brown, Gerald Baldwin; Maclehose, Louisa (eds.). Vasari on Technique: Being the Introduction to the Three Arts of Design, Architecture, Sculpture and Painting, Prefixed to the Lives of the Most Excellent Painters, Sculptors and Architects. J. M. Dent & Co.
- Vasari, Giorgio (1991). The Lives of the Artists. Translated with an introduction and notes by J.C. and P. Bondanella. Oxford University Press. ISBN 978-0-19-953719-8.
- Viollet-le-Duc, Eugène (1868). Dictionnaire raisonné de l'architecture française du XIe au XVIe siècle. Édition BANCE.
- Watkin, David (1986). A History of Western Architecture. Barrie and Jenkins. ISBN 0-7126-1279-3.
- Wenzler, Claude (2018). Les cathédrales gothiques: Un défi médiéval (in French). Éditions Ouest-France. ISBN 978-2-7373-7712-9.

=== Further reading ===
- Alonso Ruiz, Begoña; Martínez de Aguirre, Javier (2011). "Arquitectura en la Corona de Castilla en torno a 1412". Artigrama (26): 103–147. doi:10.26754/ojs_artigrama/artigrama.2011267858. ISSN 0213-1498.
- Buttitta, Antonino, ed. (2006). Les Normands en Sicile. Musée de Normandie. ISBN 978-88-7439-328-2.
- Fletcher, Banister; Cruickshank, Dan, Sir Banister Fletcher's a History of Architecture, Architectural Press, 20th edition, 1996 (first published 1896). ISBN 0-7506-2267-9. Cf. Part Two, Chapter 14.
- Bumpus, T. Francis (1928). The Cathedrals and Churches of Belgium. T. Werner Laurie. ISBN 978-1-313-40185-2.
- Ceccarini, Patrizio (2013). La structure fondatrice gothique. Théologie, sciences et architecture au XIIIe siècle à Saint-Denis (tomeI). Vol. I. L'Harmattan Editions Distribution. ISBN 978-2-336-30184-6.
- Ceccarini, Patrizio (2013). Le système architectural gothique. Théologie, sciences et architecture au XIIIe siècle à Saint-Denis. Vol. II. L'Harmattan Editions Distribution. ISBN 978-2-336-30185-3.
- Clifton-Taylor, Alec (1967). The Cathedrals of England. Thames and Hudson. ISBN 978-0-500-18070-9.
- Cram, Ralph Adams (1909). "Gothic Architecture." The Catholic Encyclopedia. Vol. 6. New York: Robert Appleton Company, 1909.
- Gardner, Helen; Kleiner, Fred S.; Mamiya, Christin J. (2004). Gardner's Art Through the Ages. Thomson Wadsworth. ISBN 978-0-15-505090-7.
- Harvey, John (1961). English Cathedrals. Batsford. ASIN B0000CL4S8.
- Huyghe, René, ed. (1963). Larousse Encyclopedia of Byzantine and Medieval Art. Hamlyn. ISBN 978-0-600-02357-9.
- Icher, Francois (1998). Building the Great Cathedrals. Abrams Books. ISBN 978-0-8109-4017-8.
- Simson, Otto Georg (1988). The Gothic cathedral: origins of Gothic architecture and the medieval concept of order. Princeton Univ. P. ISBN 978-0-691-09959-0.
- Glaser, Stephanie, "The Gothic Cathedral and Medievalism", in: Falling into Medievalism, ed. Anne Lair and Richard Utz. Special Issue of UNIversitas: The University of Northern Iowa Journal of Research, Scholarship, and Creative Activity, 2.1 (2006). (on the Gothic revival of the 19th century and the depictions of Gothic cathedrals in the Arts)
- Moore, Charles (1890). Development & Character of Gothic Architecture. Macmillan and Co. ISBN 978-1-4102-0763-0.
- Rivière, Rémi; Lavoye, Agnès (2007). La Tour Jean sans Peur, Association des Amis de la tour Jean sans Peur. ISBN 978-2-95164-940-8
- Rudolph, Conrad ed., A Companion to Medieval Art: Romanesque and Gothic in Northern Europe, 2nd ed. (2016)
- Sitwell, Sacheverell (1969), Gothic Europe. London: Weidenfeld & Nicolson.
- Summerson, John (1983). Pelican Books (ed.). Architecture in Britain, 1530–1830. Penguin Books. ISBN 978-0-14-056003-9.
- Swaan, Wim (1982). Art and Architecture of the Late Middle Ages. Omega Books. ISBN 978-0-907853-35-0.
- Tatton-Brown, Tim; Crook, John (2002). The English Cathedral. New Holland Publishers. ISBN 978-1-84330-120-2.
- Tonazzi, Pascal (2007) Florilège de Notre-Dame de Paris (anthologie), Editions Arléa, Paris, ISBN 2-86959-795-9
- Wilson, Christopher (2005). The Gothic Cathedral – Architecture of the Great Church. Thames and Hudson. ISBN 978-0-500-27681-5.
