= Madonna between St Catherine and St Margaret =

14th altarpiece painting

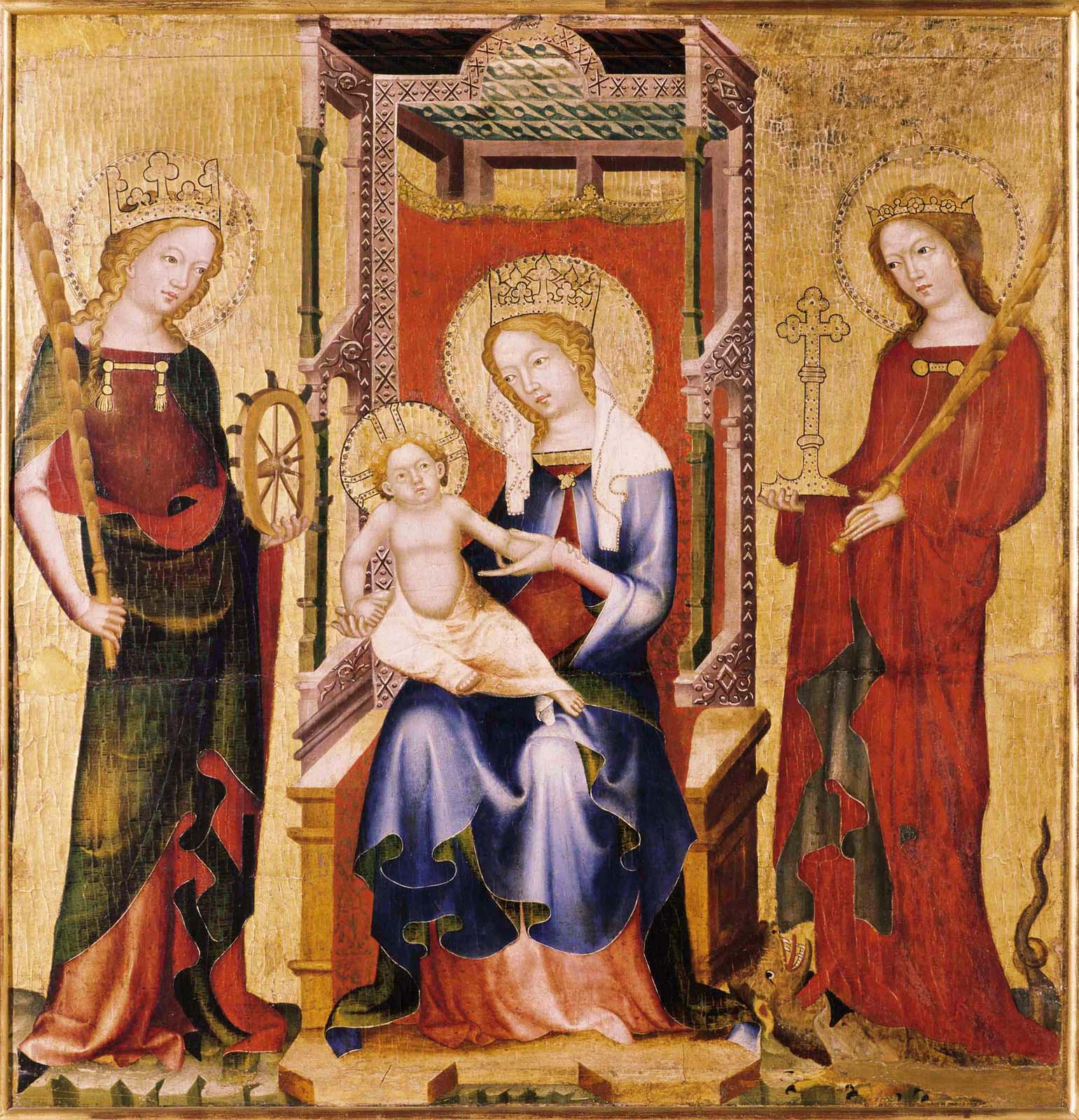
Madonna between St Catherine and St Margaret (before 1360), Aleš South Bohemian Gallery in Hluboká nad Vltavou

The panel painting of The Madonna between St Catherine and St Margaret dating from the period before 1360 most probably formed the central part of a lost altarpiece in the Cistercian Abbey of Zlatá Koruna. It is a key work of early Bohemian Gothic painting. It is on display at the permanent collection of the Aleš South Bohemian Gallery in Hluboká nad Vltavou.

The painting was in private possession in Český Krumlov until it was purchased in 1880 by the Town Museum in České Budějovice, from where it was transferred to the Aleš South Bohemian Gallery in Hluboká nad Vltavou.

== Description and classification ==
It is a tempera painting with a gilded background on a chalk base with engraved drawing. The spruce-wood panel covered with canvas, measuring 102 x 98.5 cm, was at a later time clearly cut down to a smaller size, since the remaining fragment of another figure’s clothing can be seen in the left-hand margin. It was restored by Bohuslav Slánský (1936, 1957).

The scene of the seated Madonna and Child accompanied by female saints is called the ‘Holy Conversation’ (Santa Conversazione). The crowned Virgin Mary sits on a throne with a canopy, and on her right knee she holds the half-naked body of the Baby Jesus who turns his face to the faithful. This type of enthroned Madonna, representing the Throne of Wisdom, originates in Byzantium and was also common in Italian Gothic painting. St Catherine standing on the left with her wheel and St Margaret on the right with the dragon, a symbol of hellish forces, both hold in their hands a palm frond as the sign of martyrdom. The crowns on the head of the Madonna and the saints are a valuable aid to dating the work. They differ from the precise execution of the Loving Madonnas by the circle of the Master of the Vyšší Brod Altarpiece and, with their proportions and the long stems of their trefoils, they are similar, for example, to the crowns in the Votive Panel of Jan Očko of Vlašim (1371).

Characteristic of this transitional period of style are certain traditional elements such as the halos, the overall composition of the Madonna and Child, and the complex, subtle and Italianate composition of the throne. In contrast to this, the features of the Virgin Mary’s face and the childish charm and playfulness of the Baby Jesus represent a shift in this theme towards a more natural character. In addition, the modelling of the bodies and the radiant colours link the work to book and panel painting of the 1360s and 1370s. The painting dates from about twenty years after the Vyšší Brod (Hohenfurth) cycle and has most in common with the Descent of the Holy Spirit. It is dated to the end of this stylistic period, when the canon became less rigid. It inclines beyond the linear style, aiming towards greater abstraction and a softening of form; towards a spiritualisation, a new conception of the function of light; and towards a richly-toned colour scheme that anticipated the style of the 1360s and the work of the Master of the Třeboň Altarpiece. Technological analysis of the picture has shown that oil was used as a bonding agent. It differs in the underpainting of the flesh tones from the Vyšší Brod (Hohenfurth) cycle and thus represents a new kind of painting technique.

== Related works ==
- Wall paintings in the presbytery of the church in Čachrov
- The illumination of the Annunciation, the Portable Breviary of John of Neumarkt
- The Vyšší Brod (Hohenfurth) cycle (The Annunciation, The Resurrection, Decent of the Holy Spirit)
- The Madonna of Kłodzko
- The Holy Trinity of Wrocław
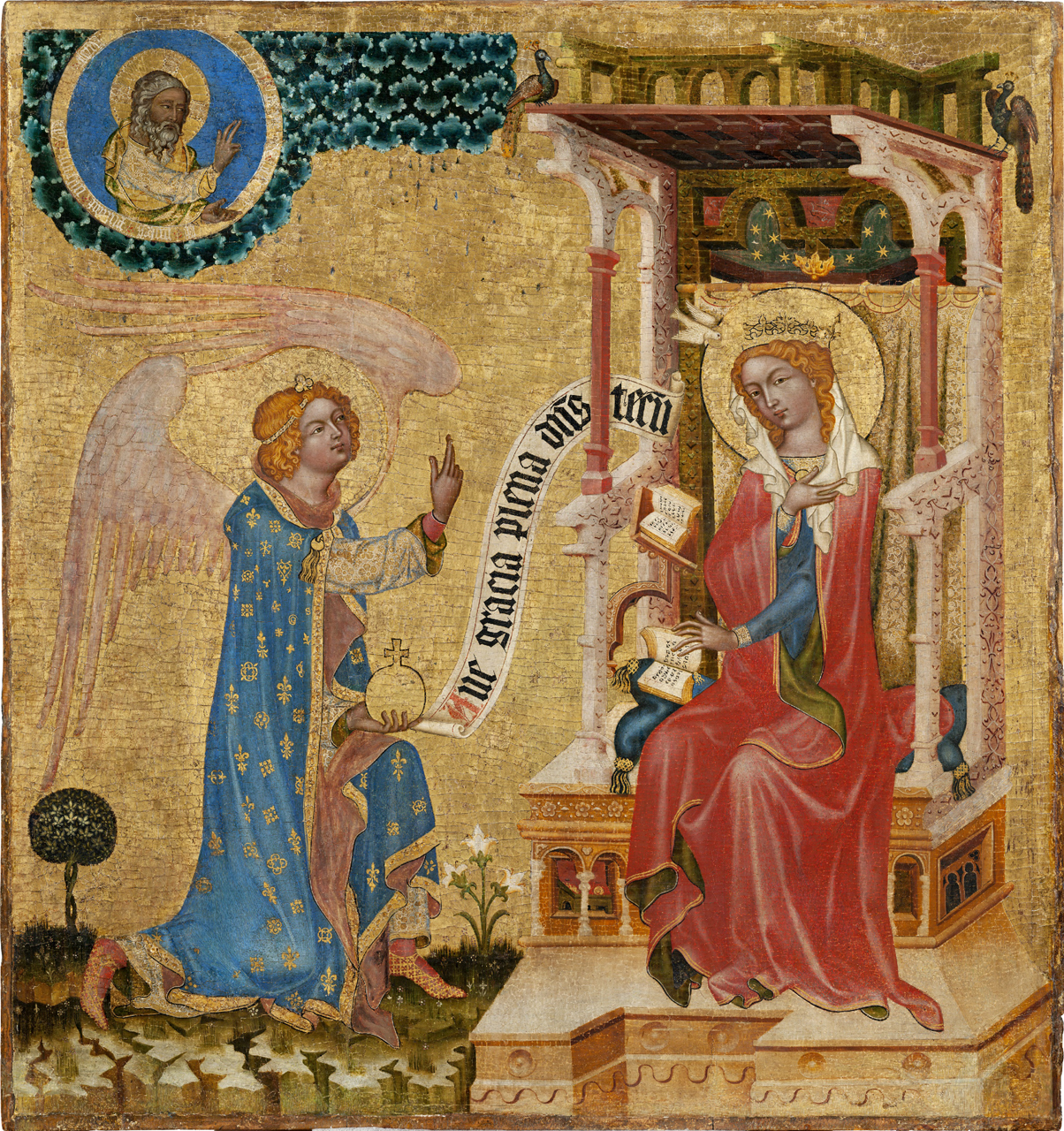
, Annunciation, Vyšší Brod (Hohenfurth) cycle

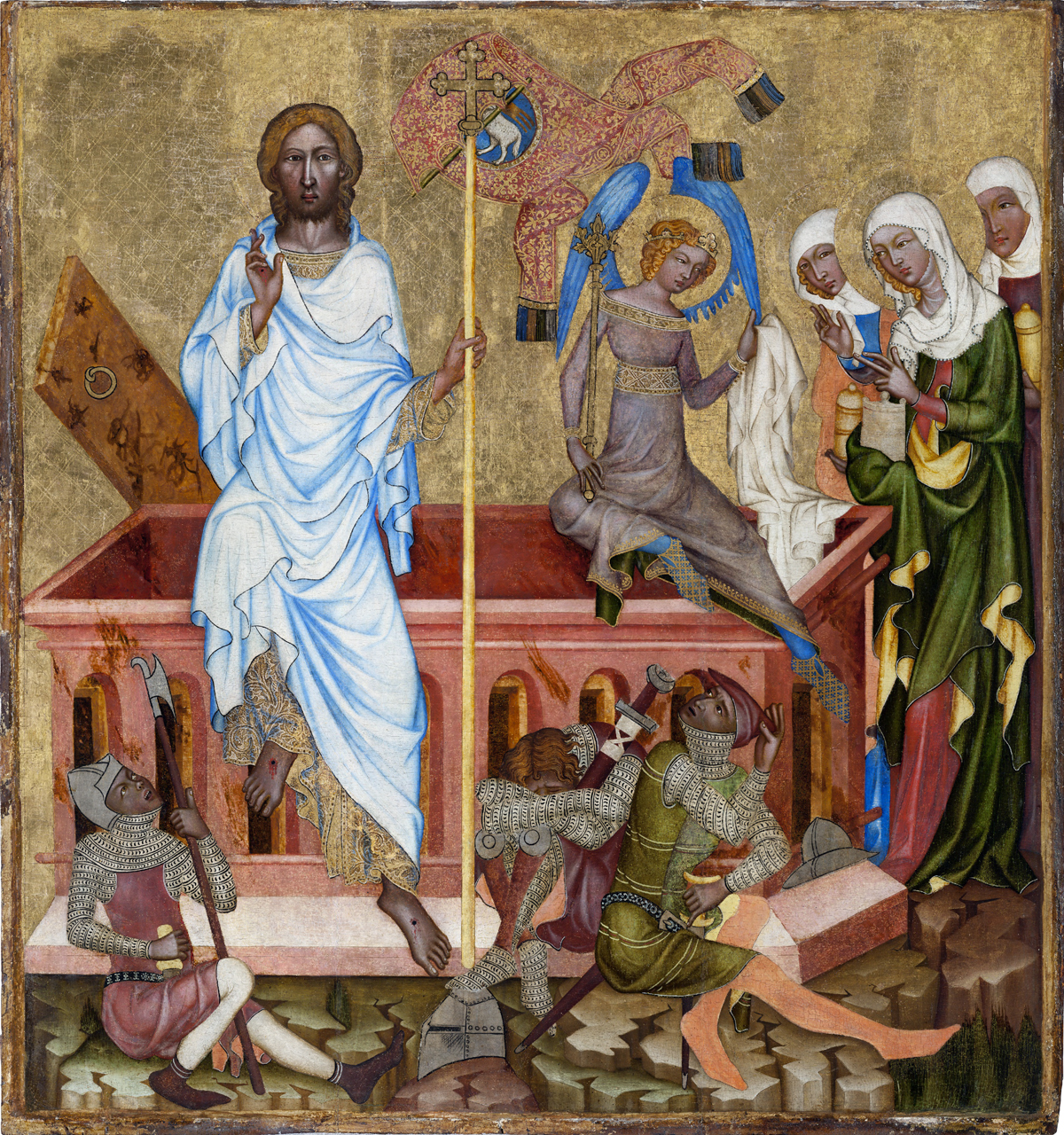
Resurrection, Vyšší Brod (Hohenfurth) cycle

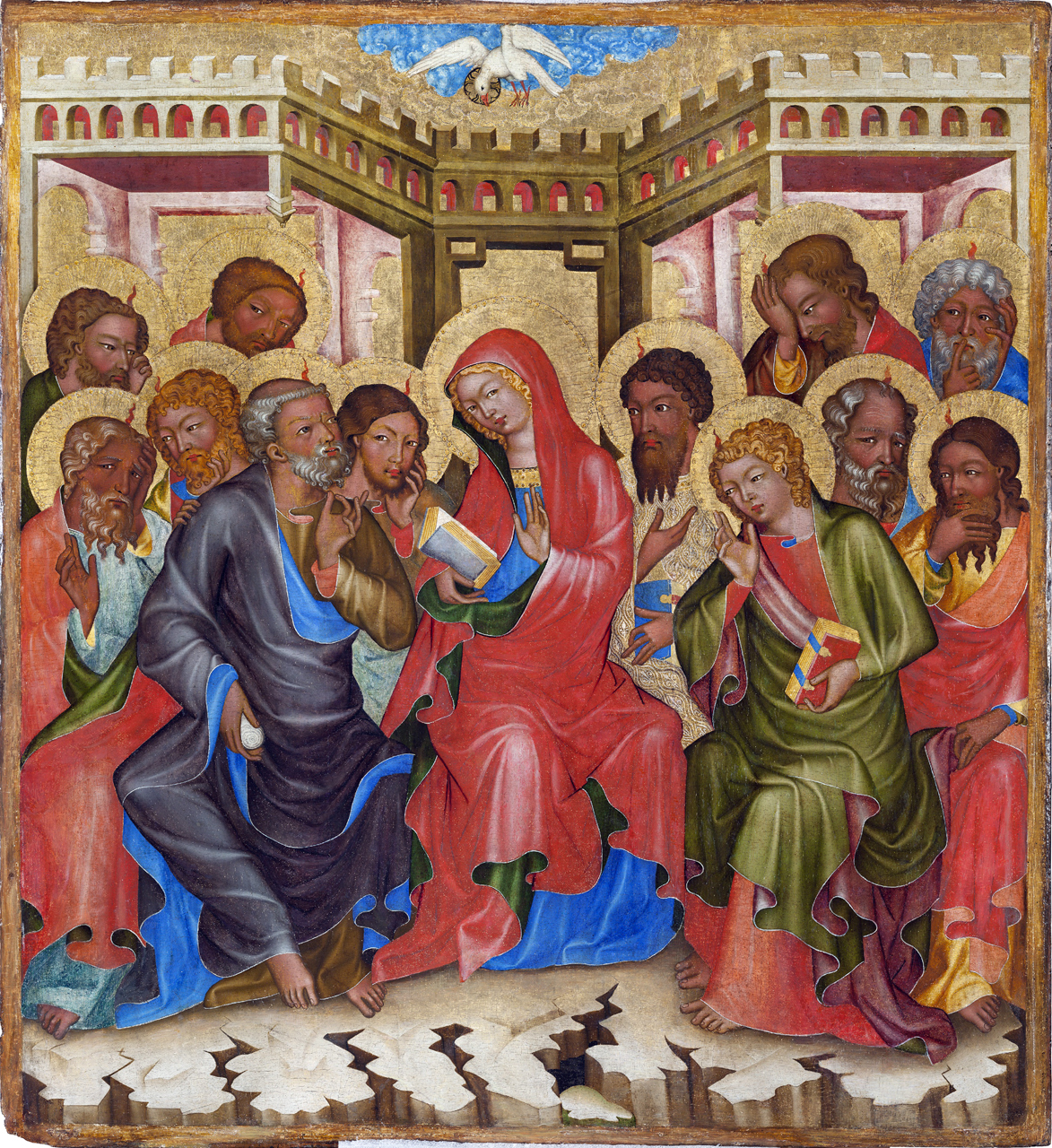
Decent of the Holy Spirit, Vyšší Brod (Hohenfurth) cycle

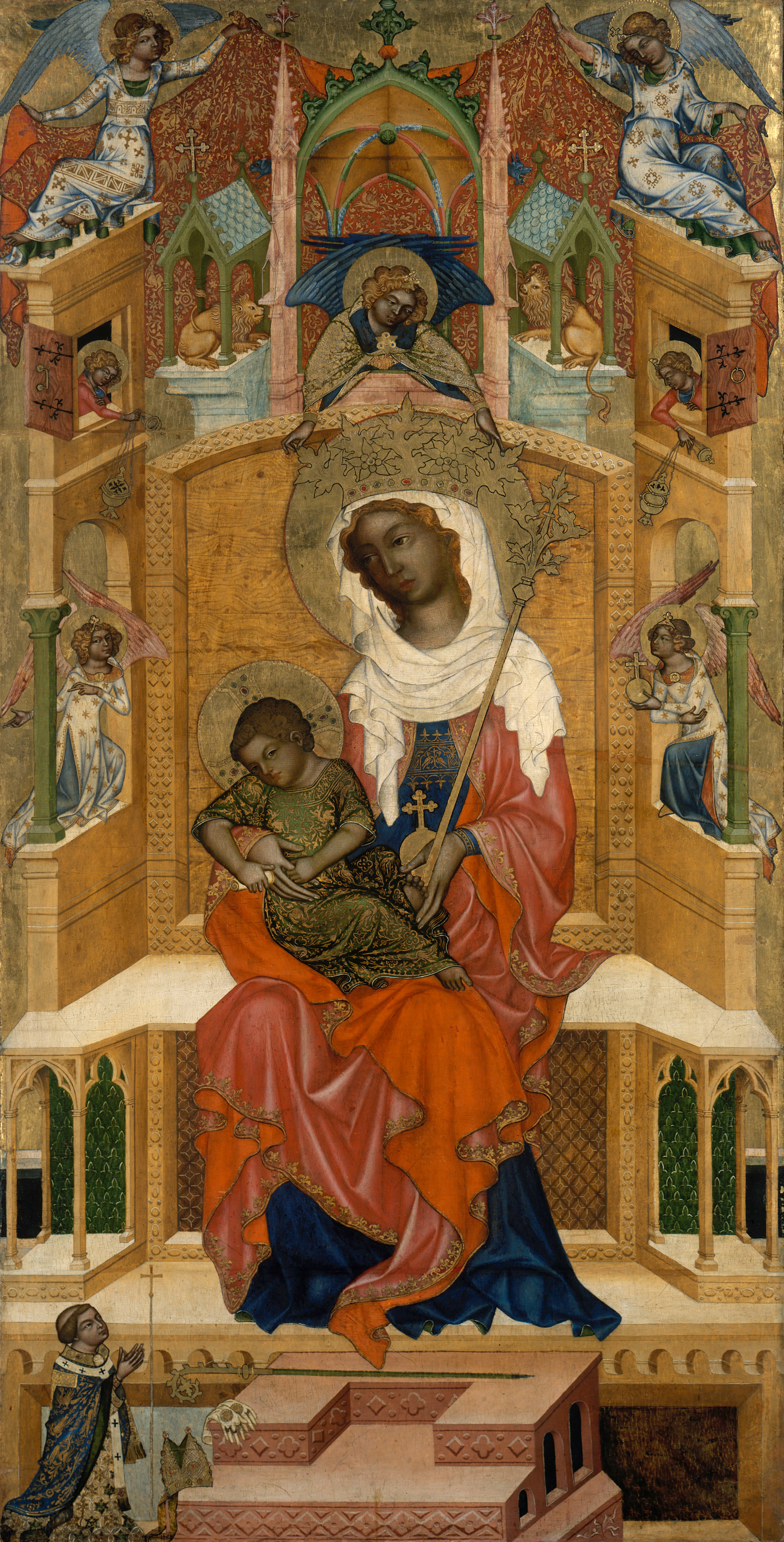
Madonna of Kłodzko, Bohemian Master - Google Art Project

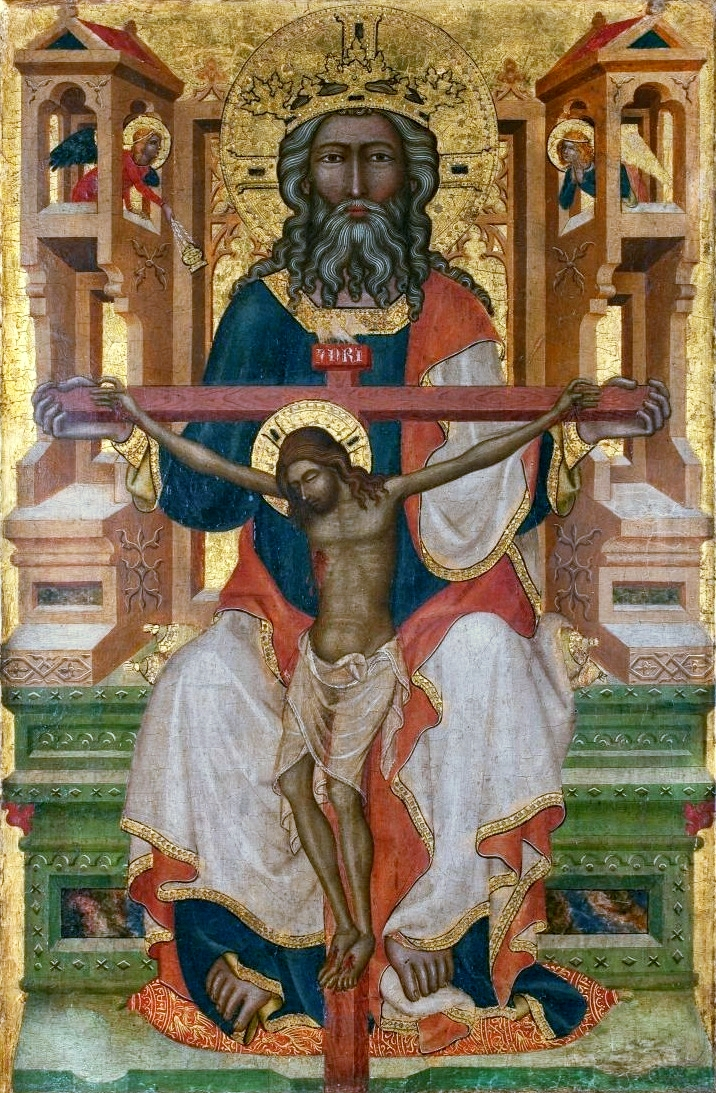
Holy Trinity of Wrocław, Bohemian master

== Sources ==
- Aleš South Bohemian Gallery in Hluboká nad Vltavou, inv. no. 0-1
- Hynek Látal a kol., Meziprůzkumy. Sbírka AJG 1300-2016, AJG 2016, ISBN 978-80-87799-52-9
- Hynek Rulíšek, Gotické umění jižních Čech, Průvodce, sv. 3, Alšova jihočeská galerie v Hluboké nad Vltavou 1989, ISBN 80-900057-6-4
- Hynek Rulíšek, Gotické umění v jižních Čechách, Národní galerie v Praze 1989, ISBN 80-7035-013-X
- Mojmír Hamsík, Die Technik der böhmischen Madonnenbilder um 1350-1360, Umění XXVI, 1978
- Jaroslav Pešina, Studie k ikonografii a typologii obrazu madony s dítětem v českém deskovém malířství kolem poloviny 14. století, Umění XXV, 1977
- Jaroslav Pešina, Desková malba, in: České umění gotické 1350-1420, Academia Praha 1970
- Vladimír Denkstein, František Matouš, Jihočeská gotika, Praha 1953
- Antonín Matějček, Česká malba gotická, Melantrich Praha 1950
- Vincenc Kramář, Madona mezi sv. Kateřinou a s. Markétou Městského muzea v Českých Budějovicích, Praha 1937
