= Madonna of Kłodzko =

14th century panel painting

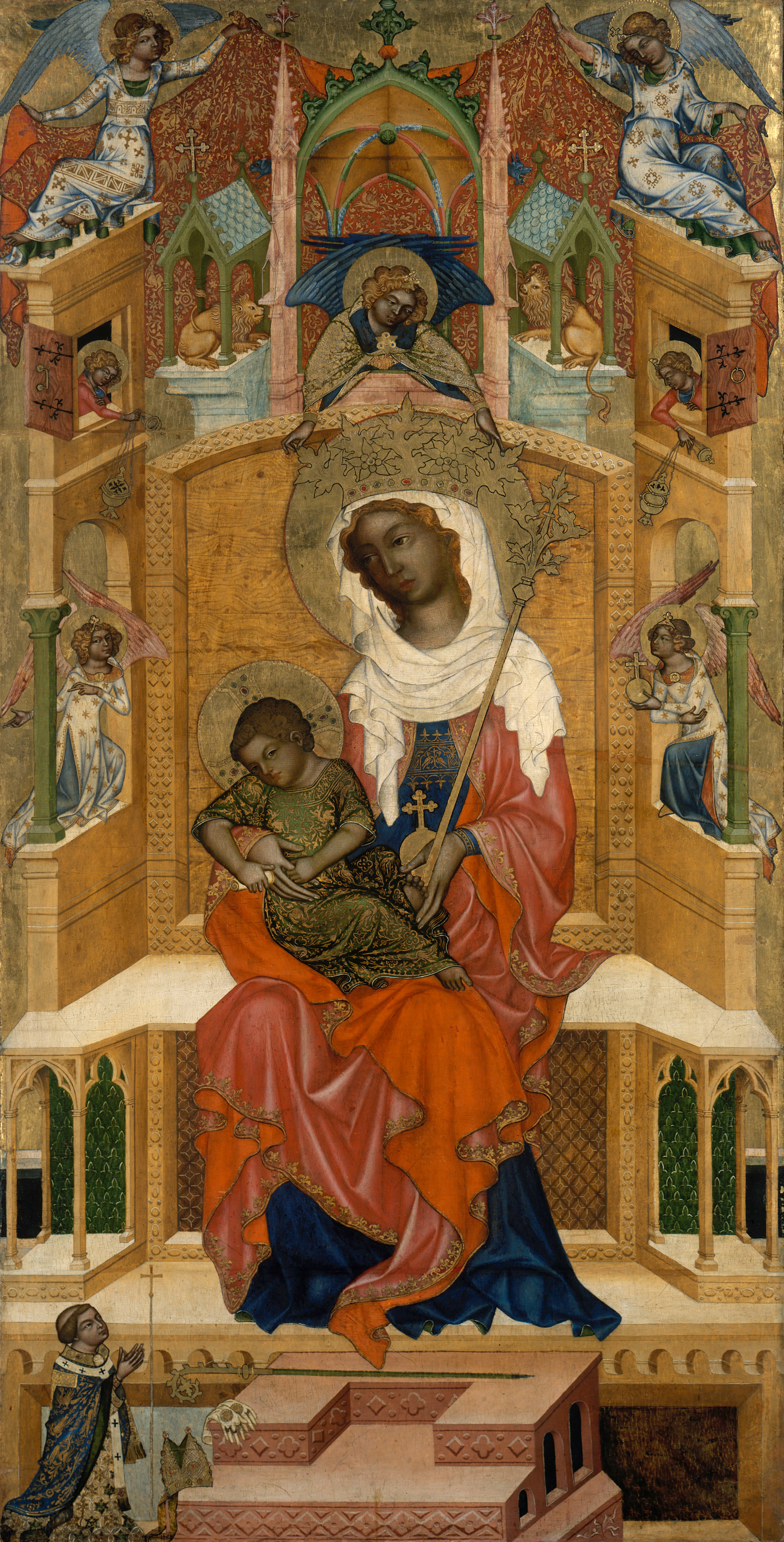
Kłodzko Madonna, Bohemian Master, Google Art Project

The Enthroned Madonna of Kłodzko (de: Glatzer Madonna) is a Bohemian panel painting dating from 1343 to 1344 that was originally the central part of a larger winged altarpiece. The altarpiece's donor was Archbishop Arnošt of Pardubice, who is portrayed in the bottom left-hand corner.

== History of the painting ==
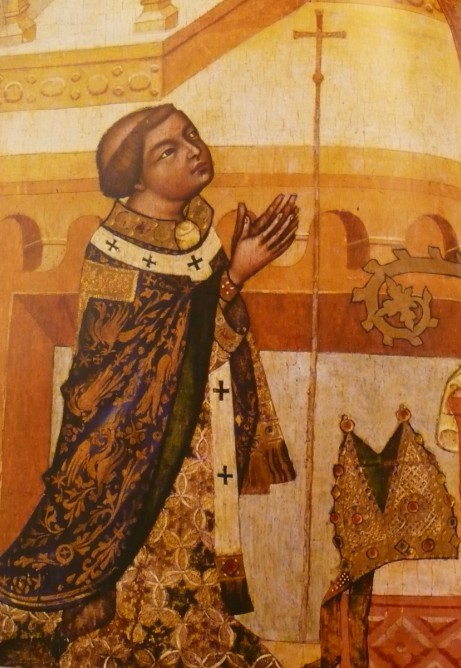
detail:Arnošt of Pardubice

The altarpiece for the Augustinian monastery in Kłodzko was commissioned before 1350 by Archbishop Arnošt of Pardubice, the monastery's founder, who spent his youth at the parish church there and, as a child, reputedly had a vision of the Virgin Mary. As archbishop, he was the founder of the Marian cult in the Czech lands. He is buried in the Church of the Ascension of the Virgin Mary in Kłodzko.

The original winged altarpiece, which included another four panels with painted scenes depicting the life of Christ (the Birth of Jesus, the Circumcision, the Flight to Egypt, and the Twelve-year-old Christ in the Temple), was seen and described by Bohuslav Balbín in his work Vita Venerabilis Arnesti primi archiepiscopi Pragensis of 1664. The monastery was taken over from the Augustinians by the Jesuits and until 1618 served as a Jesuit college. Although Kłodzko was besieged and damaged during the Thirty Years' War, the altar was saved by the burgrave Johann Georg Semling and the Lutheran nobleman Adrian von Eckersdorf. After 1625, the altarpiece was the pride of the local parish church, and in the 19th century, it was situated in the royal grammar school in Kłodzko. From there, the painting of the enthroned Madonna was purchased in 1902 by the Berlin Kaiser-Friedrich-Museum. It now belongs to the Berlin-Dahlem State Museum.

== Description ==
This monumental picture is 186 x 95 cm large and is tempera-painted on stretched canvas over a poplar panel. It is a work that comes from the circle of the Master of the Vyšší Brod Altarpiece or his follower. The motif of the Enthroned Madonna surrounded by angels, the composition of space united by the perspective-based receding of lines, the dark-skinned complexion, the unusual size of the child, and the fondness for precious fabrics all have their origin in northern Italy. At the same time, however, a series of details indicate a direct influence mediated by the Rhineland. The Madonna's crown of leaves and richly folded veil appear as archaic French models that emerged in Bohemian book painting in the early 14th century. The architecture of the throne also relates to French ivory reliefs.

The soft modelling of the faces links this picture with the work of the Master of Vyšší Brod. The appearance of the Madonna and angels links it with the panel paintings The Adoration of the Magi, The Annunciation, The Resurrection, and The Lamentation of the Vyšší Brod Altarpiece.

Both the "Madonna of Veveří" and the "Strahov Madonna" belong to the same period as the Kłodzko Madonna, while the artist who painted the Kaufmann Crucifixion also belonged to a broader circle, perhaps linked by previous training in the workshop of the "Master of the Klosterneuberg Altarpiece".

Compared with the Vyšší Brod panels, the Kłodzko Madonna shows several important innovations, especially in the perspectival projection of the throne, the accentuating of spatial depth through the colour-based graduating of areas, the modelling of the high relief of the drapery and in the overall human warmth of the presentation from which the entire typology of Bohemian loving Madonnas was developed right through to the early 15th century.
