= Kaufmann Crucifixion =

Bohemian Gothic panel painting

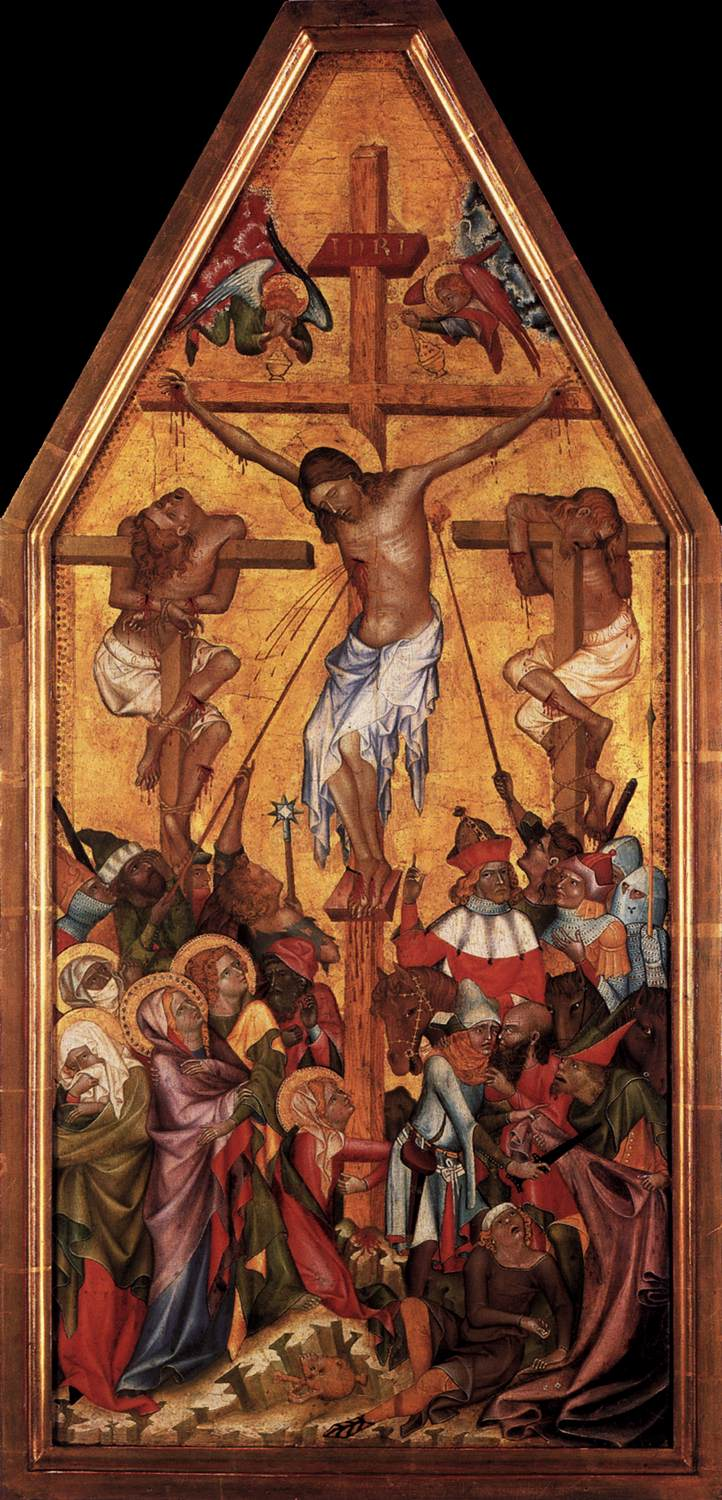
Kaufmann Crucifixion, Gemäldegalerie Berlin

The Kaufmann Crucifixion is a Bohemian Gothic panel painting by an unknown artist that dates from 1340-1360. It was most probably the central part of a relatively small folding altarpiece.

== History of the painting ==
The picture was probably painted in Prague. It was acquired from the Berlin collection of Richard von Kaufmann (1849-1908) by the Berlin art dealers Pavel Cassirer and F.W. Lippmann along with Hugo Helbing from Munich, who donated it to the then Kaiser Friedrich Museum in Berlin. From there, the picture found its way to the Gemäldegalerie Berlin.

== Description and context ==
The tempera painting on a wooden panel covered with stretched canvas is 67 x 29.5 cm in size. It was restored in 1918 and fixed to a fresh canvas base. In the Bohemian context, it is the first known depiction of Calvary with three crosses and a complexity of events beneath them, which both point to an Italian influence. The composition of space and the use of perspectival shortening are also Italian in origin. At the same time, other elements of the painting such as the wealth of rhythm in the figures’ movement, the sharp drawing, the plastic modelling and the Gothic vividness of colour also point to Lower Austrian and western European (French) models. The dramatically focused naturalism is something of an exception to the otherwise lyrical atmosphere of Bohemian painting. Although the overall stylistic conception of the picture has a number of features that correspond to the work of the Master of the Vyšší Brod Altarpiece, it is in fact a later work by another artist that represents a progression from mystically religious expression to a dramatic presentation of reality and the intensifying of its effect.

Opinion is divided among art historians as to the work's Bohemian origin, some of them considering it to be the work of an Austrian artist who emerged from the workshop of the Master of the Klosterneuburg Altarpiece (de: Meister der Rückseite des Verduner Altars). This is also connected with the dating of the work that some, in connection with the Klosterneuburg Altarpiece (1331) have pinpointed to the later period of John of Luxembourg (1340) while others judge it to be influenced by Italian art (such the picture The Crucifixion by Simone Martini of 1342) and consider it more likely to have been painted after 1350.

In its form, the Kaufmann Crucifixion is a perfect work that has no parallels in European painting of that period. Several of its motifs were later often adopted, especially that of the man sitting on the ground with one leg bent and the other stretched out. Works inspired by the Kaufmann Crucifixion can be evidenced in surviving panel paintings, though also in manuscript illuminations in Bohemia and other countries.
