= Master of Vyšší Brod =

Anonymous Bohemian painter

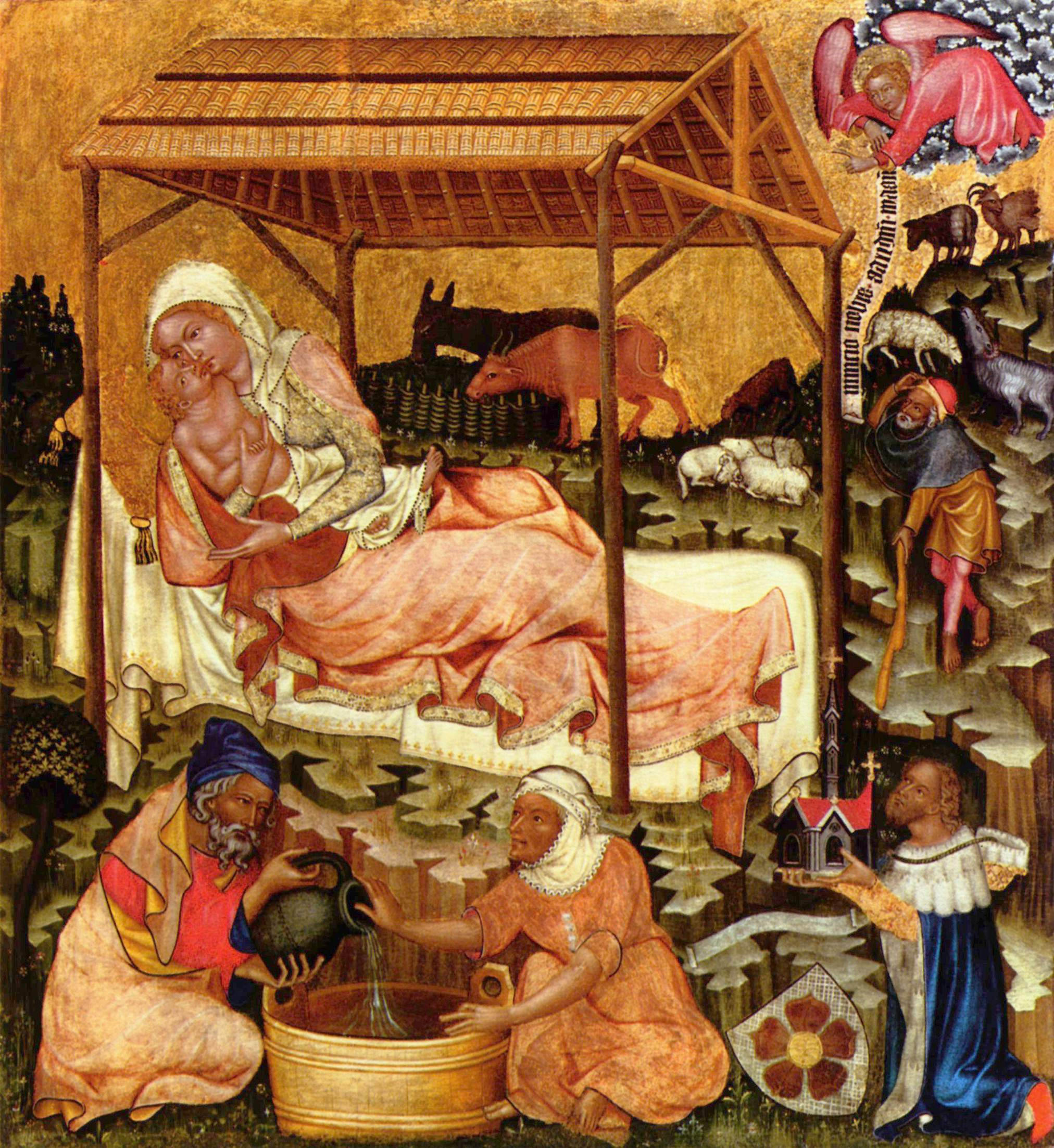
Nativity scene from the Vyššì Brod altarpiece, now in Prague

The Master of Vyšší Brod (also known as the Master of Hohenfurth, from the German name for the town of Vyšší Brod) was an anonymous Bohemian painter active around 1350. It seems likely that he was from Prague originally; an altarpiece for the Cistercian convent of Vyšší Brod, from which his name is derived, may still be seen in Prague. Datable to around 1350, the painting, whose panels are now disbanded, depicts the Infancy of Christ along with scenes from the Passion. It may be seen in the Convent of St. Agnes branch of the National Gallery in Prague. The scenes depicting the Annunciation, the Nativity, the Adoration of the Magi and the Resurrection are ascribed to the Master's hand, while other portions are believed to be the product of his studio.

A number of other paintings, including the Madonna of Kladsko, the Kaufman Crucifixion (both of which are held in Berlin), the Madonna of Vysehrad, and the Madonna of Veveri, have been assigned to the Master on the basis of style.
