= List of depictions of the Virgin and Child =

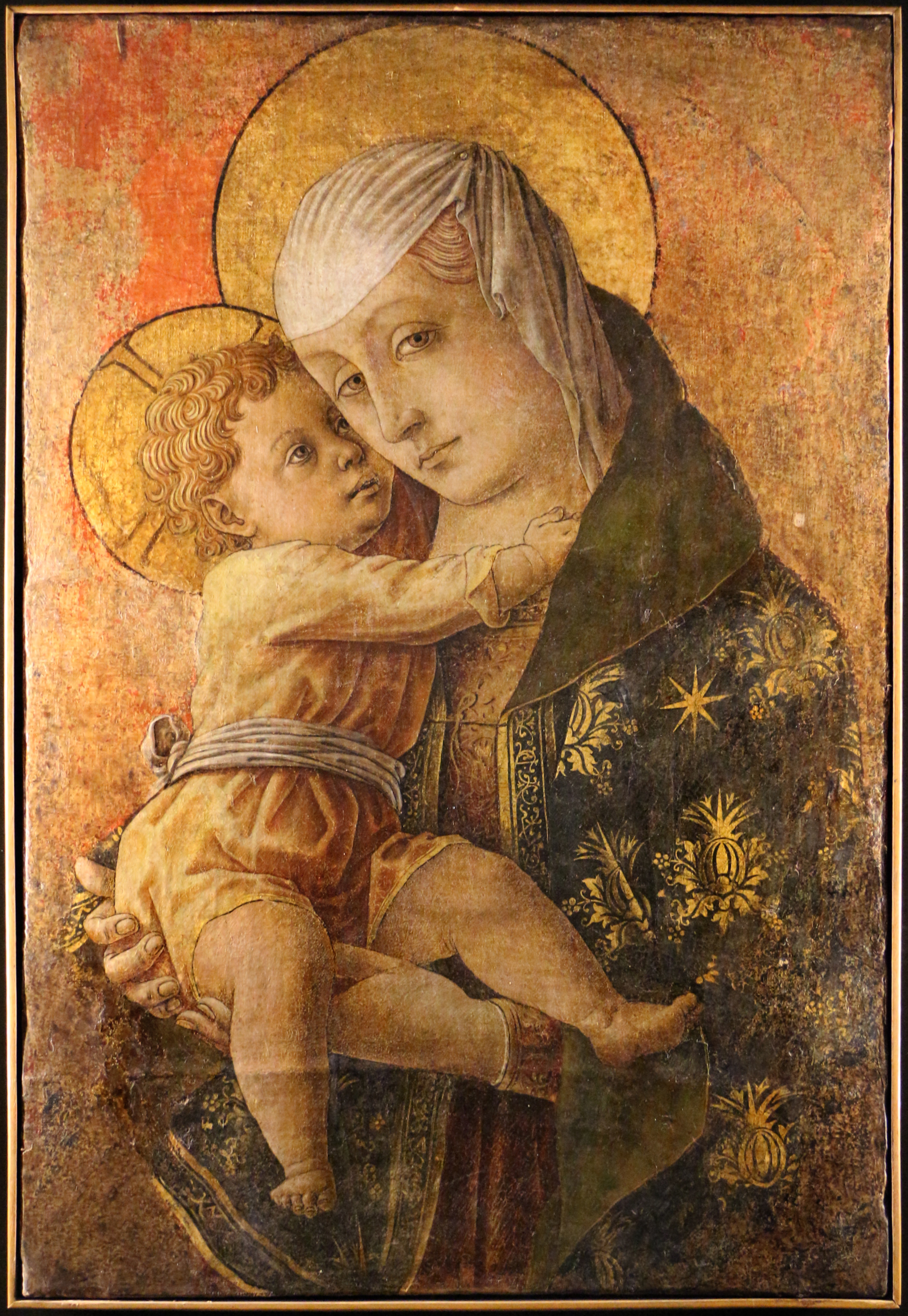
A simple Italian Virgin and Child by Carlo Crivelli, c. 1470

Virgin and Child or Madonna and Child or Mary and Child usually refers to artistic depictions of Mary and Child Jesus together, as part of both Catholic and Orthodox church traditions, and very notably in the Marian art in the Catholic Church. The various different names are effectively interchangeable, and any particular work may be given different titles by different sources.

== Particular types ==
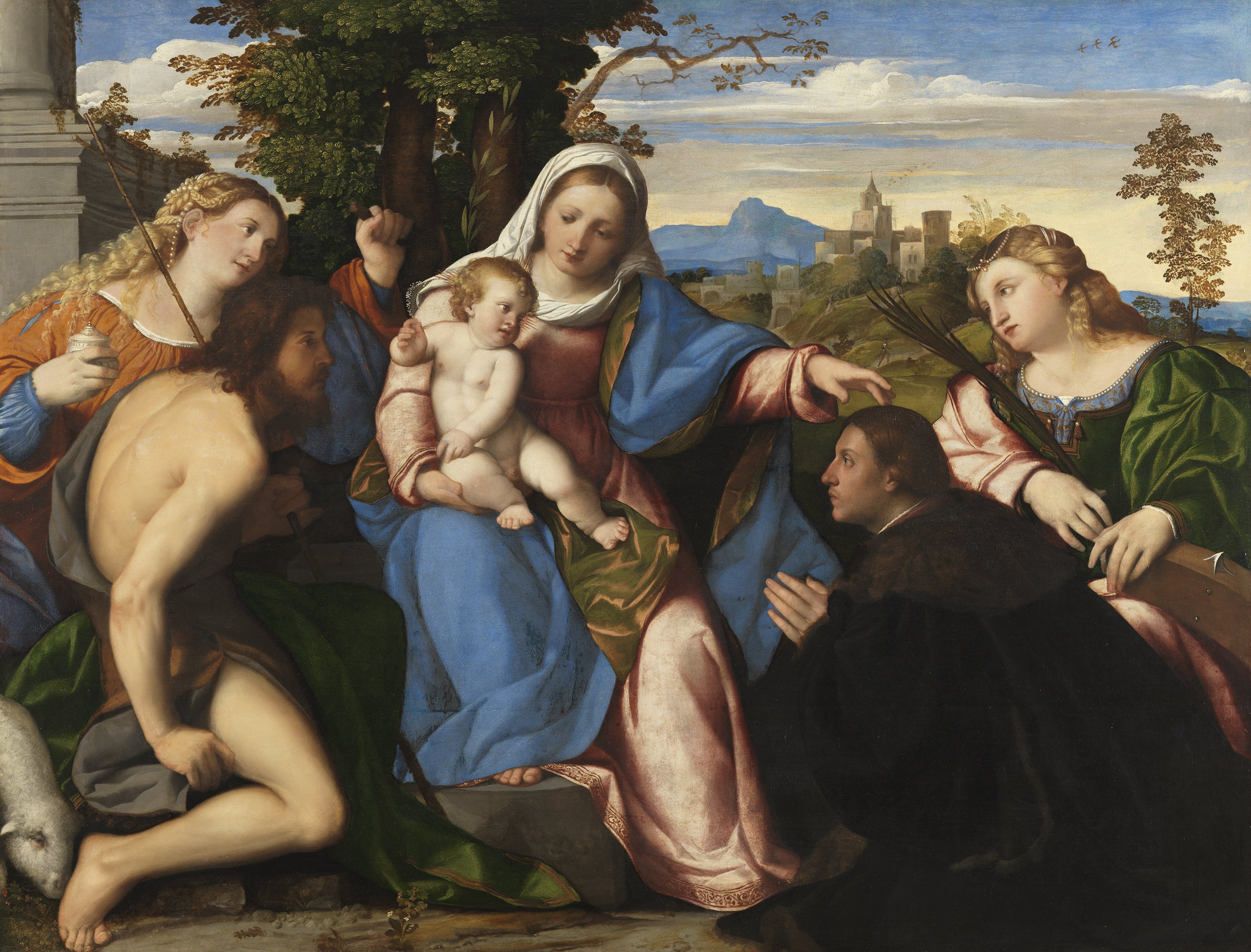
Sacra conversazione or Virgin and Child with saints, in this case in a landscape setting with a donor portrait, Palma Vecchio, c. 1519

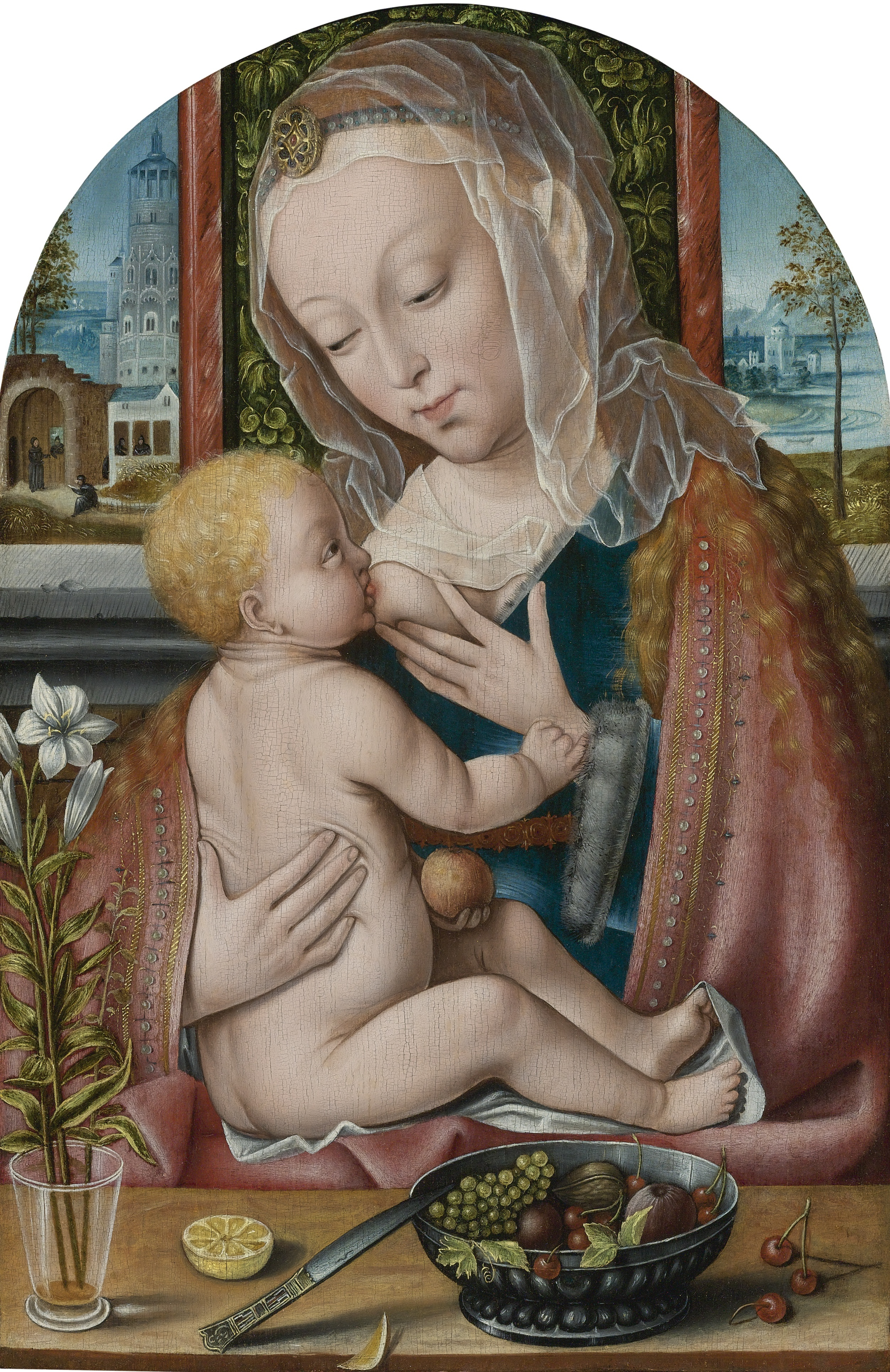
Maria Lactans, Circle of Joos van Cleve, 1515-20

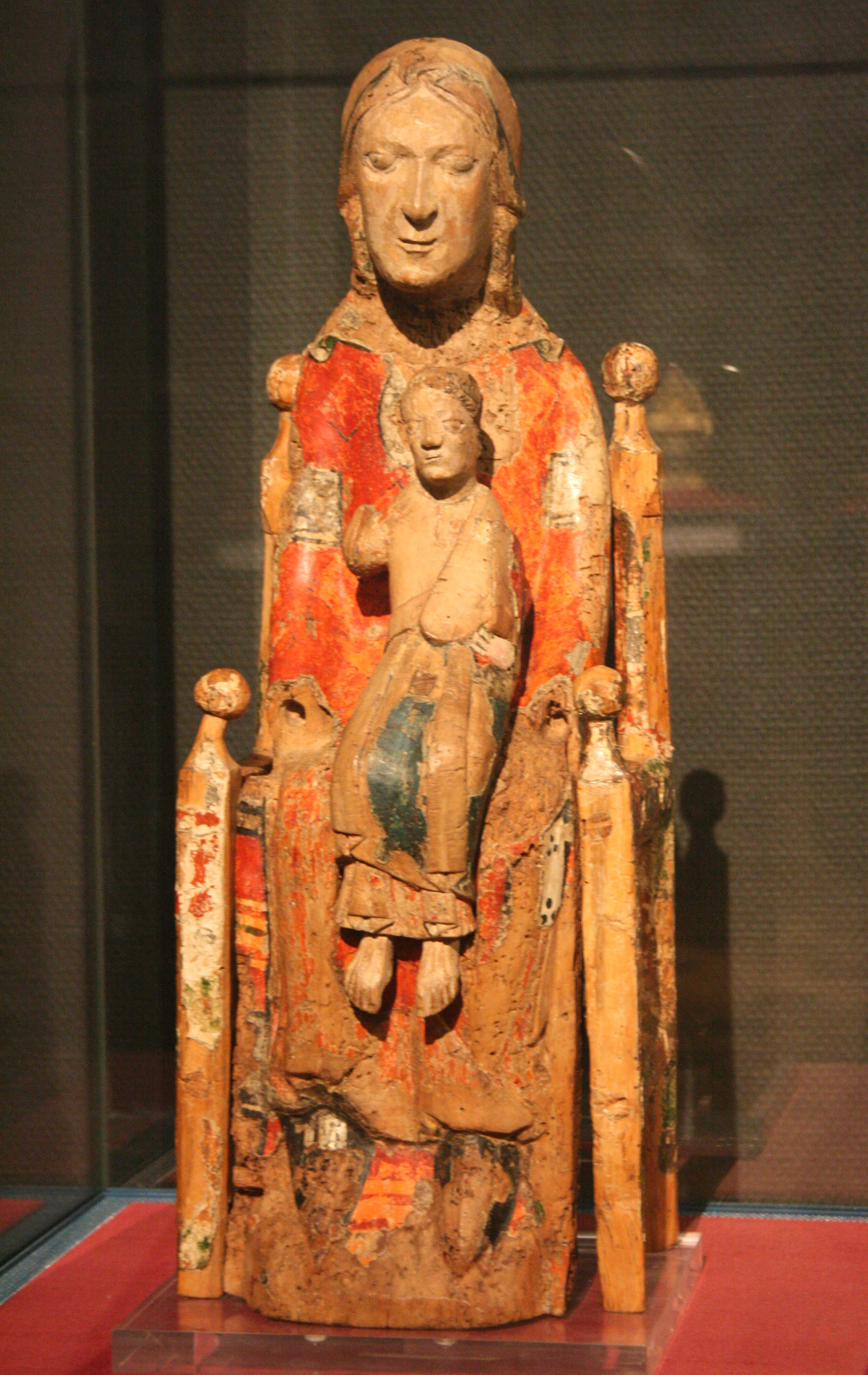
Seat of Wisdom, enthroned Virgin with Child, Mosan art, 11th century

- Nursing Madonna (Maria/Madonna Lactans)
- Seat of Wisdom, enthroned Virgin with Child, especially in Romanesque art
- Hodegetria, one of the most important of the many types of Eastern Orthodox icons of the Virgin and Child
- Black Madonna
- Beautiful Madonna

== List of works ==
Images of the Virgin and Child were for centuries the most common subject for Christian religious art. There are many thousands of surviving historical images. The following is a list (probably incomplete) of those with articles, listed by their usual type of title (although other title forms may be found).

=== Virgin and Child ===
- The Virgin and Child (The Northbrook Madonna)
- Virgin and Child (Filocamo, Palermo) by Antonio Filocamo
- Enthroned Virgin and Child (English, The Cloisters), a statuette
- Virgin and Child (after van der Goes?) by Hugo van der Goes or Gerard David
- Virgin and Child (Rubens)
- Virgin and Child Enthroned (van der Weyden)
- Virgin and Child from the Sainte-Chapelle, an ivory sculpture
- The Virgin and Child Surrounded by the Holy Innocents by Peter Paul Rubens
- Virgin and Child with Canon van der Paele
- Virgin and Child with a Cat by Rembrandt van Rijn
- Virgin and Child with an Angel (Botticelli, Florence)
- Virgin and Child with an Angel (Botticelli, Boston) also known as Our Lady of the Eucharist by Sandro Botticelli
- Virgin and Child with Four Angels by Gerard David
- Virgin and Child with Four Angels (Donatello), a bronze roundel by Donatello
- The Virgin and Child with Four Holy Virgins by Master of the Virgo inter Virgines
- Virgin and Child with the Infant John the Baptist (Botticelli, Cleveland)
- Virgin and Child with the Infant John the Baptist (Botticelli, São Paulo)
- Virgin and Child with a Rosary by Artemisia Gentileschi
- Virgin and Child with Saint Anne, a subject in Christian art showing Saint Anne with her daughter, the Virgin Mary, and her grandson Jesus
  - The Virgin and Child with St. Anne (Leonardo) by Leonardo da Vinci
  - The Virgin and Child with St. Anne (van Steffeswert), also known in Dutch as The Virgin and Child with St. Anne (van Steffeswert), work by Jan van Steffeswert
  - The Virgin and Child with St Anne and St John the Baptist by Leonardo da Vinci
  - Virgin and Child with Saint Anne (Masaccio)
- Virgin and Child with Saints (van der Weyden)
- Virgin and Child with Saints Barbara and Catherine by Quentin Matsys
- The Virgin and Child with Two Angels (Andrea del Verrochio)

=== Madonna and Child ===
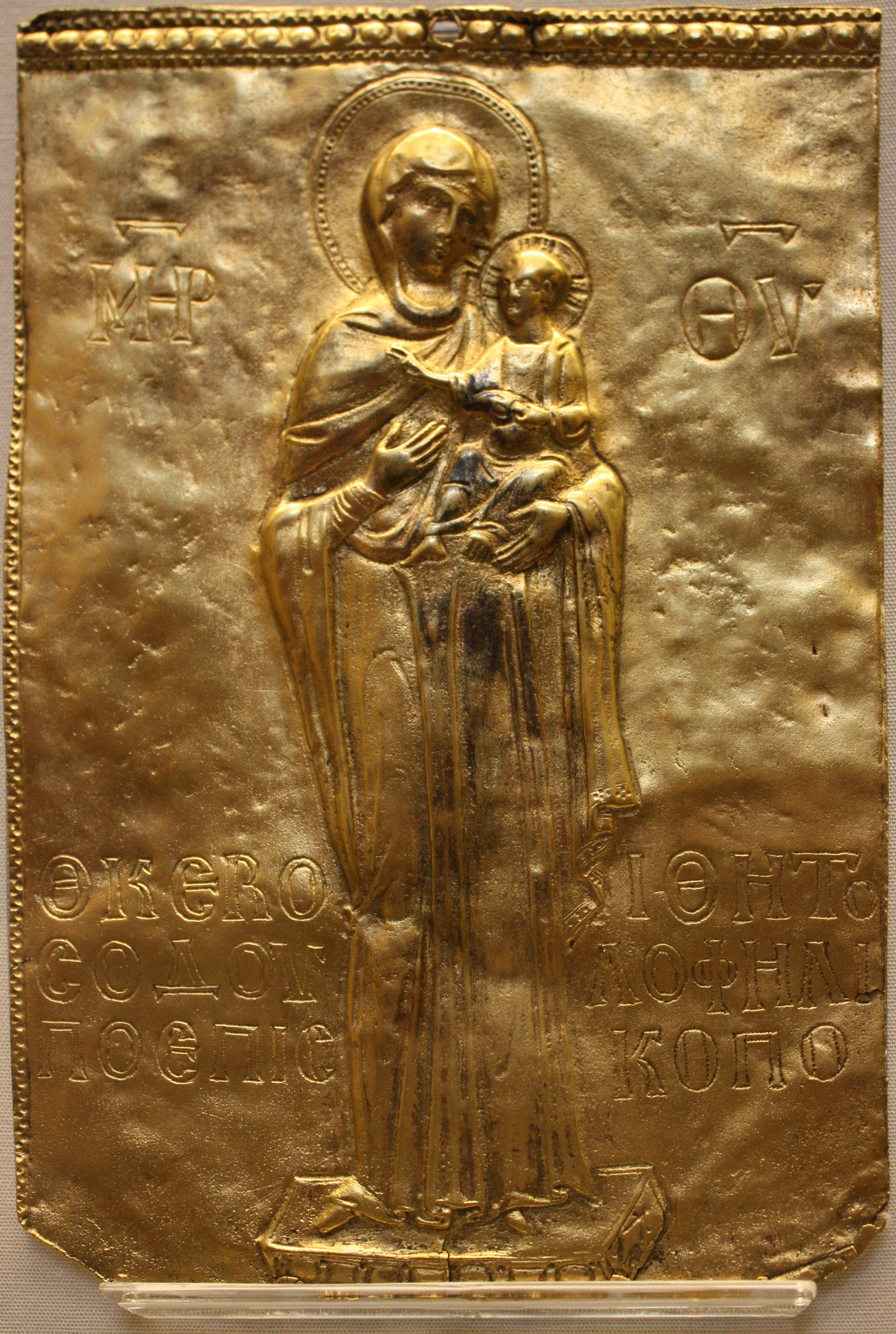
Hodegetria type. 12th-century plaque found in Torcello Cathedral; a full-length figure like the original in Constantinople

- Enthroned Madonna and Child with Saints by Agnolo Gaddi
- Enthroned Madonna and Child (Filippo Lippi)
- Madonna and Child Enthroned with Saints (Raphael) by Raphael
- Madonna and Child (Artemisia Gentileschi)
- Madonna and Child (Botticelli, Avignon) by Sandro Botticelli
- Madonna and Child (Duccio) by Duccio di Buoninsegna
- Madonna and Child (Lippi) by Filippo Lippi
- Madonna and Child (Masaccio) by Masaccio
- Madonna and Child (van Dyck) by Anthony van Dyck
- Madonna with Child between Sts. Flavian and Onuphrius by Lorenzo Lotto
- Madonna and Child Kissing by Quentin Matsys
- Madonna and Child Playing with the Veil by Jan Gossaert
- Madonna and Child with the Book by Raphael
- Madonna with Child Enthroned between Saints John the Baptist and Sebastian by Pietro Perugino
- The Madonna and Child with the Infant St. John the Baptist (Leonardo da Vinci) by Leonardo da Vinci
- Madonna with Child with Young John the Baptist (Cranach) by Lucas Cranach the Elder
- Madonna and Child with St. Anne (Dei Palafrenieri) by Caravaggio
- Madonna and Child with Saint John and the Angels, also known as Manchester Madonna, an unfinished painting attributed to Michelangelo
- Madonna and Child with Saints Michael the Archangel and Andrea by Cima da Conegliano
- Madonna and Child with saints polyptych (Duccio), a five-piece Madonna polyptych by Duccio di Buoninsegna
- Madonna and Child with Saints (Signorelli, Arezzo) by Luca Signorelli
- Madonna and Child with Saints Luke and Catherine of Alexandria by Titian
- Madonna and Child with St. John the Baptist and St. Mary Magdalene by Neroccio di Bartolomeo de' Landi
- Madonna and Child and Two Angels (Botticelli) by Filippo Lippi
- Madonna with Child (Crivelli) by Carlo Crivelli
- Madonna with Child and Saints (Pontormo) by Jacopo Pontormo
- Madonna with Child and six Angels (Duccio) by Duccio di Buoninsegna
- Madonna and Child with Two Donors (van Dyck) by Anthony van Dyck
- Madonna with Writing Child by Pinturicchio
- Madonna with Writing Child and Bishop by Pinturicchio
- Madonna with Writing Child and St. Jerome by Pinturicchio
- Madonna Adoring the Child with Five Angels (Botticelli) by Botticelli

=== Madonna of ===
- Madonna of Jan Vos also known as Virgin and Child, with Saints and Donor by Jan van Eyck
- La Madonna de Bogota (Raphael) attributed to Raphael
- Madonna of Bruges by marble sculpture by Michelangelo
- Madonna of the Carnation also known as Madonna with Vase or Madonna with Child, by Leonardo da Vinci
- Madonna of the Harpies by Andrea del Sarto
- Madonna of Humility (Gentile da Fabriano)
- Madonna of Humility (Fra Angelico)
- Madonna of Loreto (Raphael)
- Madonna of the Pinks by Raphael
- Madonna of the Quail attributed to Pisanello
- Madonna of the Red Cherubim by Giovanni Bellini
- Madonna of the Rose Garden attributed to Michelino da Besozzo or Stefano da Verona
- Madonna of Roudnice
- Madonna of the Rose (Raphael) by Raphael
- Madonna of the Rose Bower by Stefan Lochner
- Madonna of the Rose Bower by Martin Schongauer
- Madonna of the Small Trees by Giovanni Bellini
- Madonna of the Stairs a relief sculpture by Michelangelo
- Madonna of Veveri
- Madonna del Bordone by Coppo di Marcovaldo
- Madonna del Padiglione (Botticelli) also known as Madonna and Child with Three Angels by Sandro Botticelli
- Madonna del Prato (Bellini)
- Madonna del Prato (Raphael)
- Madonna della seggiola by Raphael
- Madonna Della Strada
- Madonna of the Yarnwinder, series of works attributed to Leonardo da Vinci and another artist
- Madonna Litta attributed to Leonardo da Vinci

=== Place or owner name first ===
- Aldobrandini Madonna by Titian
- Alzano Madonna or Madonna with Child, by Giovanni Bellini
- Diptych of Philip de Croÿ with The Virgin and Child a pair of paintings by Rogier van der Weyden
- Garvagh Madonna by Raphael
- Ince Hall Madonna, also known as Virgin and Child Reading by Jan van Eyck
- Lucca Madonna (van Eyck) by Jan van Eyck
