= Madonna of the Dry Tree =

Painting by Petrus Christus

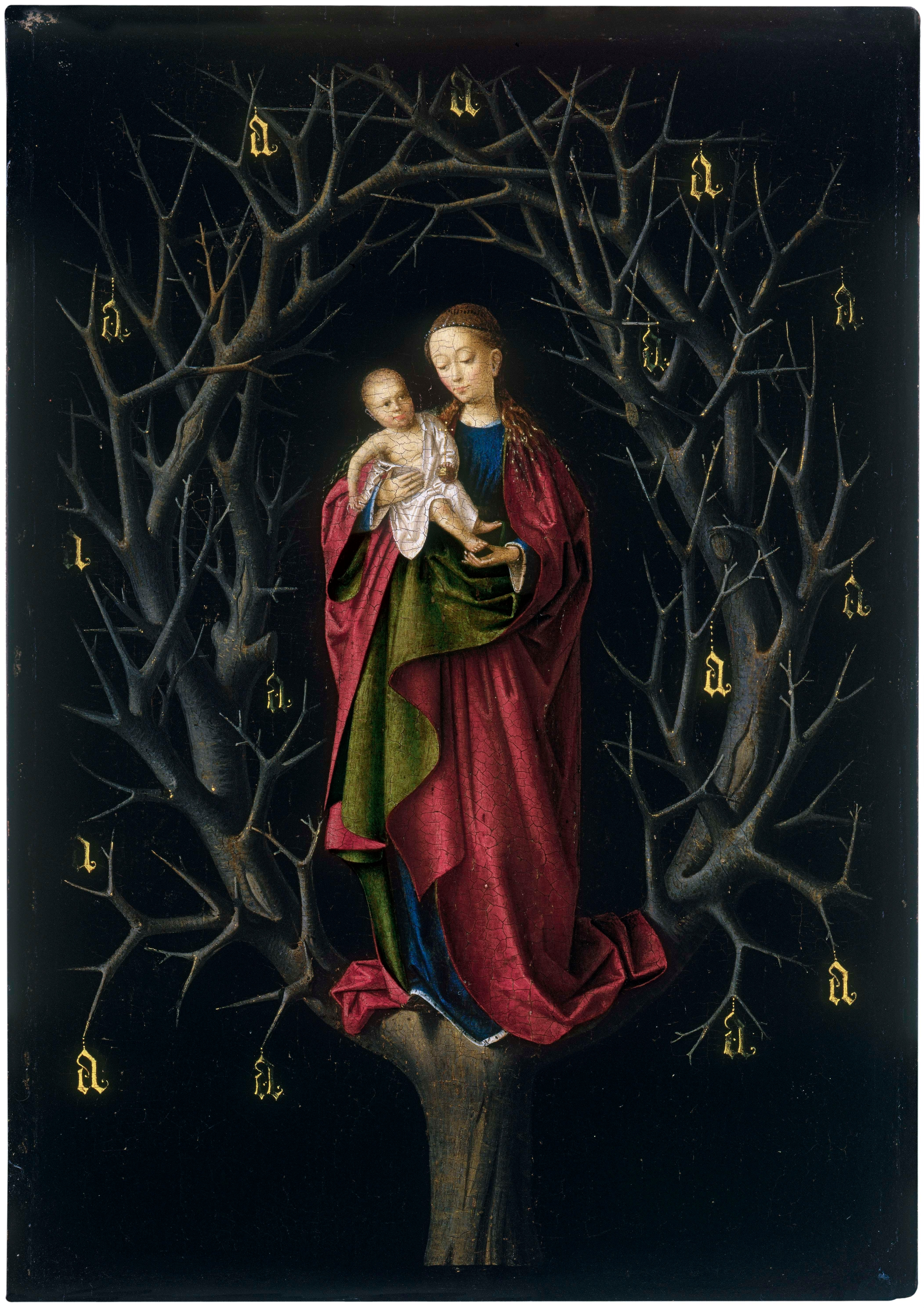
- Madonna of the Dry Tree
- Artist: Petrus Christus
- Year: 1480
- Type: Oil-on-panel
- Dimensions: 14.7 cm × 12.4 cm (5.8 in × 4.9 in)
- Location: Museo Thyssen-Bornemisza, Madrid

Madonna of the Dry Tree or Our Lady of the Barren Tree is a small oil-on-oak panel painting dated c. 1462–1465, attributed to the Early Netherlandish painter Petrus Christus. Its dramatic imagery shows the Virgin Mary holding the Christ Child within a tree, surrounded by black, withered branches forming a crown of thorns. The panel is unsigned and undated. It was unattributed until 1919, when the art historian Grete Ring associated its iconography and painterly style with Christus and through a detailed examination of its imagery assigned its current title.

The circumstances of its commission are unknown, although its size indicates it was intended for private devotion. Its stark and haunting imagery is thought to be derived from the Book of Ezekiel, with the Dry Tree (or solitary tree) representing a withered and dead version of the Garden of Eden's Tree of Knowledge, brought back to life by the presence of the Virgin and Christ. The fifteen golden A-shaped letters hanging from its branches may represent the first letter of the Angelus, Angelus Domini nuntiavit Mariae, or the Ave Maria.

The iconography is presumed to be related to the devotions of Confraternity of Our Lady of the Dry Tree of Bruges, which Petrus Christus and his wife Gaudicine joined.

== Description ==
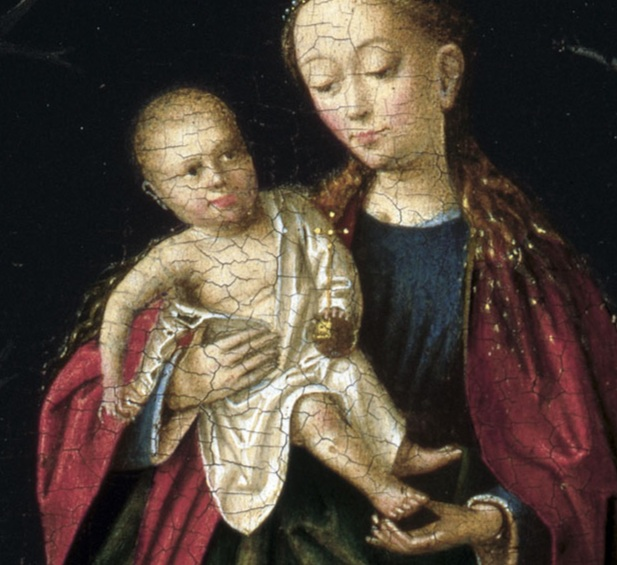
Detail showing a restless Jesus holding an orb decorated with the cross. In some accounts, his resurrection would return the leaves of the tree of life to bloom

Mary stands in the fork of the barren tree, surrounded by a spiral of thin and spiky branches forming an oval arch around her. She cradles the Christ child with her right hand and holds his dangling feet with the other. The folds of her bright red robe, with its green lining, are painted in sharp, sculptural lines. Other than a single thin band of ermine at its hem, her blue dress is plain and unadorned, and resembles the dress in Christus's Exeter Madonna. Unusually for a Northern Renaissance Madonna, her face is individualised; her features are not soft or rounded as with idealised models, and her expression is less presupposing than earlier Madonnas. The art historian Joel Upton describes her as a "warm and human figure...very attractive, and yet serene and demure as the Mother of God."

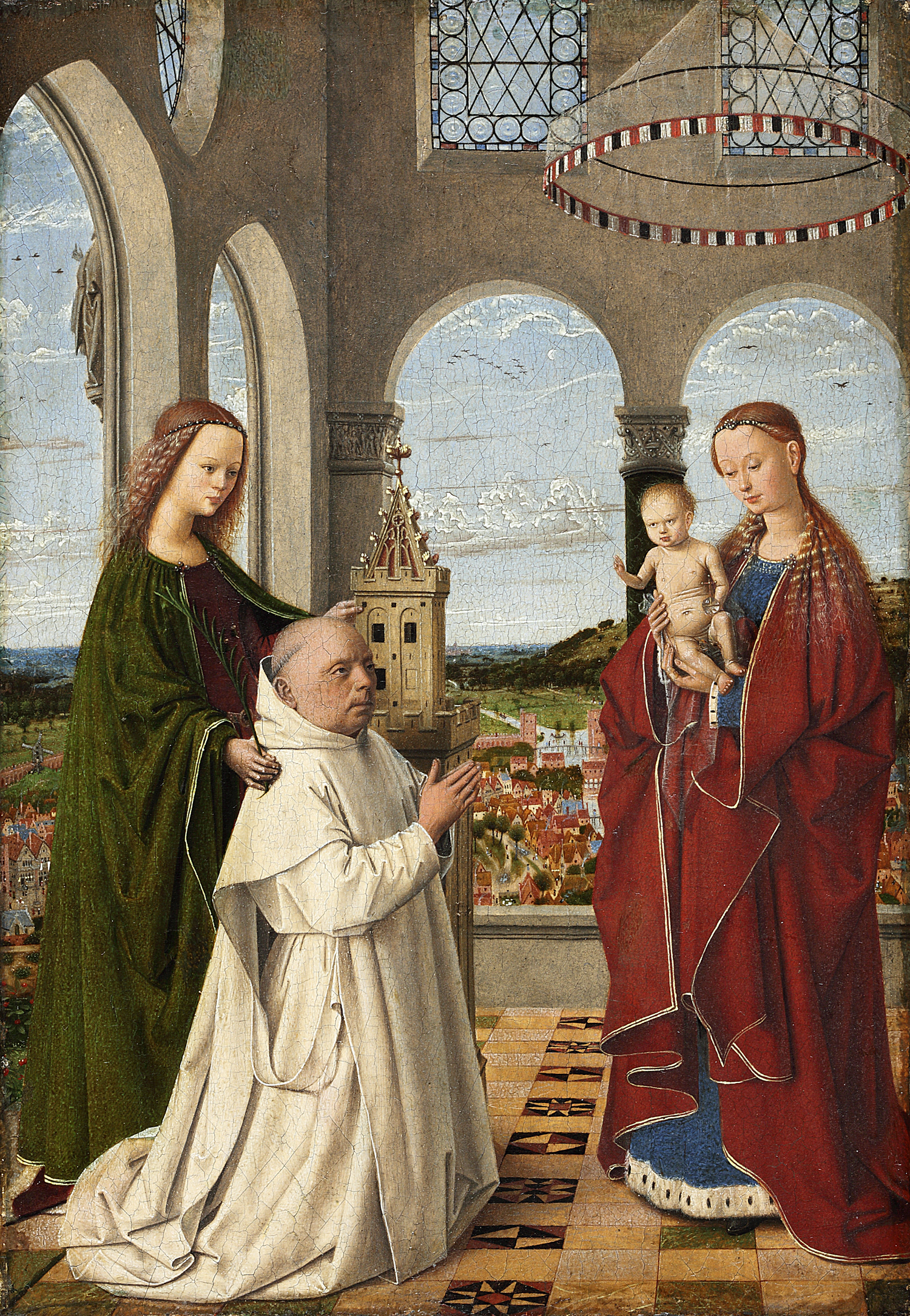
The Exeter Madonna, Petrus Christus, c. 1444. Gemäldegalerie, Berlin

The representation of the Christ Child is probably derived from Rogier van der Weyden, given the playful attitude and amiable facial expression. As Christus may not have had access to Rogier's work, the influence was likely second-hand, perhaps by the intermediary of the paintings of Hans Memling.

The panel adopts an illustionistic scale, perhaps influenced by van der Weyden's Durán Madonna, in which Mary is placed in an undefined space that seems much smaller than her physical presence. Van der Weyden and Christus's figures are similarly larger than scale and cramped within a shallow and sculptural niche. They are brightly lit compared to the black background. Christus employs trompe-l'œil techniques in a number of passages, creating a three-dimensional effect that adds to the strangeness and disembodied atmosphere. These can be most notably seen in the Virgin's hand as it lies below the child's toes, in the orb held in his hands, and in the golden letters hanging from the tree briars.

X-radiography indicates there were few preparatory underdrawings apart from a series of ruled lines used to position the figures and surrounding elements within the overall design. The art historian Maryan Ainsworth notes that this is typical of Christus's smaller panels, some of which can be considered miniatures, and compares it to contemporary illuminated manuscripts.

== Confraternity ==
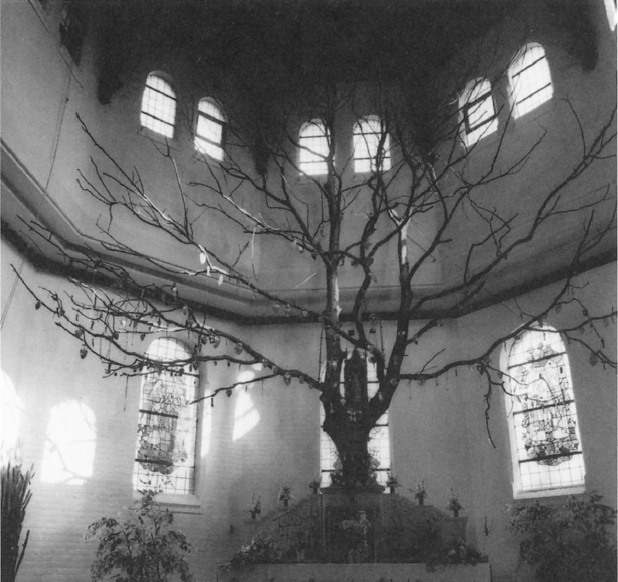
Our Lady in the Oak Meerveldhoven, Veldhoven, Netherlands. Tree from an ascendant cult with an image of the Virgin venerated since the 13th century.

The painting may be associated with the confraternity of "Our Lady of the Dry Tree". The confraternity was closely associated with Philip the Good who, they believed, prayed to an image of the Virgin carved on a tree during a battle against the French; following his victory he is said to have established "Our Lady of the Dry Tree", although it is documented as extant as early as 1396. Its seal, visible on extant ledgers, shows a thorny dry tree with dangling As.

The confraternity met in a chapel at the Franciscans Church of the Minorites (Minoritenkirche). (Note: The chapel was destroyed in 1578, during the Netherlandish Reformation.) Membership was restricted to the upper echelon of Burgundian society, and included Philip's wife Isabella of Portugal, most of the leading Burgundian nobles, and upper-class families and foreign traders of Bruges, such as the Portinaris. Christus and his wife Guadicine were listed as members in 1462, and appear on the list of new members the following year. He joined the fraternity for the same reason Gerard David would some years later: (Note: David's 1509 The Virgin among the Virgins, which contains portraits of both the artist and his wife, Cornelia Cnoop, is thought to have been painted to gain favour and integrate within the confraternity.) to establish himself in Bruges society and attract wealthy patrons. (Note: The couple were also members of the "Virgin of the Snow" from 1467-68.) A 1469 contract Christus cosigned indicates he may have assumed an administrative role for the organization, as well as being a board member.

Although the iconography is clearly associated with the confraternity, it is not known whether Christus received a commission from the organization or an individual member. The confraternity's inventory of 1495 does not list a painting of the Dry Tree. Its small size suggests it may have been commissioned as a private devotional piece.

== Iconography ==
The wilted and thorny tree may be a dark representation of the biblical "Tree of Knowledge". Art historians see it as a metaphor for original sin, that will remain dead until redeemed by the second coming of Christ. The iconography maybe based on the Ezekiel 17:24: "...and all the trees of the field shall know that I the Lord have brought down the high tree, have exalted the low tree, have dried up the green tree, and have made the dry tree to flourish".

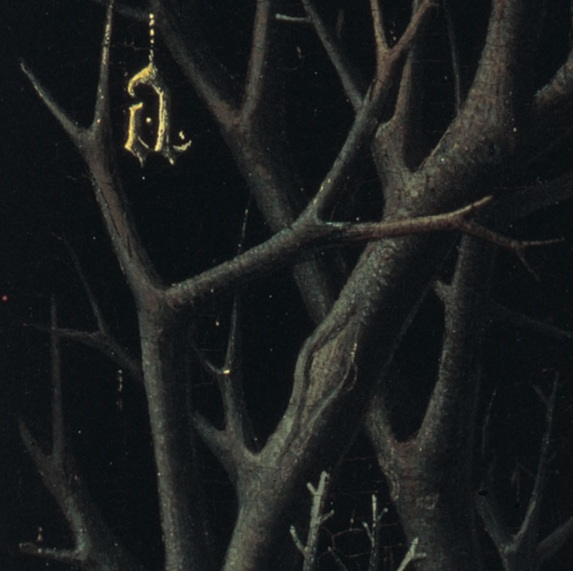
Golden letter A hanging from dark withered branch.

The French philosopher Guillaume de Deguileville (b. 1295) wrote in Le Pèlerinage de l'Âme ("The Pilgrimage of the Soul") that so as the Tree of Knowledge received a graft from the Tree of Life, bringing it back to life, the barren Saint Anne gave birth to Mary. Ainsworth sees the panel as "almost a literal translation of de Deguileville's text" – the green graft symbolizes Mary who in turn gives birth to the Christ child, "the fruit of this growth and Savior of Mankind". The orb and cross in his hands and the spiny thorns fashioned into a surrounding crown indicate his role as Savior, while the dry tree itself may be a representation of both the Fall of Man and Redemption.

The fifteen golden A-shaped letters hanging from the branches are generally interpreted as abbreviations for the Ave Maria ("Hail Mary") prayer. Their number may allude to the 150 Hail Mary's recited in the contemporary rosary; that is 15 rounds of 10 decades), although this form did not become popular until 1475, some ten years after Christus' panel. Two other interpretations for the A's have been put forth. One is that they symbolize arbor or arbore, as other similar devotional works show the trees in an arbor. The art historian Hugo van der Velden suggests the possibility that the piece might have been commissioned by a member of the confraternity, Anselme Adornes (d. 1464), whose interest in devotional work is evidenced by his possession of van Eyck's Saint Francis Receiving the Stigmata. (Note: Although Christus did not train under Jan van Eyck, he was seen by contemporaries as "van Eyckian" in style, and was often commissioned for that reason. See Richardson (2007), p. 73)

Ainsworth describes the iconography's darkness as unprecedented in Netherlandish painting. The art historian Bernhard Ridderbos sees the panel as a unique "miraculous cult image", rather than a typical late-medieval illustration of a biblical scene. Its size at 14.7 by 12.4 centimetres (5.8 in × 4.9 in) suggests it was almost certainly meant as an intimate personal devotional object with the viewer's attention directed only on the mother, child, and tree. Its presentation and immediacy attracts to the point that it becomes a "subjective extension" of reality.

== Dating and attribution ==
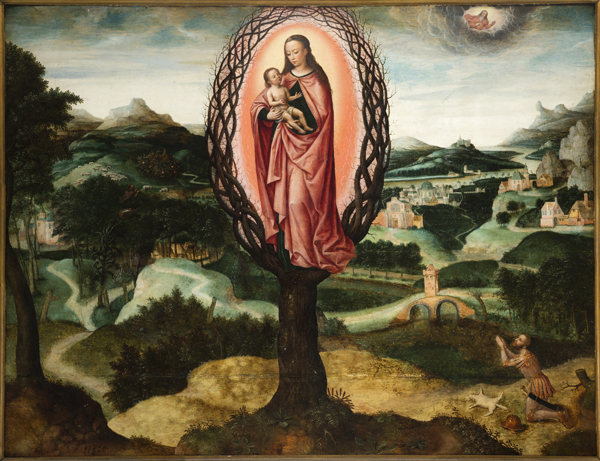
Madonna of the Brotherhood of the Dry Tree, Pieter Claeissens, 1620

Most scholars assume a completion date between mid-1440s and early–1460s, based on factors such as the near identical red robe worn by Mary in Christus's Exeter Madonna and that painting's similarities to van Eyck's c. 1441 Madonna of Jan Vos. A date of 1462—1463 or later is most likely correct, based on Christus's relationship with the Confraternity of the Dry Tree, and the adoption of van der Weyden stylisations in Christus's later works.

Grete Ring was the first art historian to undertake a complete study of the painting when, in 1919, she definitively attributed it to Christus, which has not been challenged since.

The panel is very similar to the central panel of a 1620 triptych by Pieter Claeissens the Younger, which may draw from the same sources.

== Provenance ==
The painting was in the Ernst Oppler collection, Berlin, before 1919. That year Ring published the first analysis of the painting, attributing Christus in her article "Onse Lieve Vrauwe ten Drooghen Boome" for the Zeitschrift für bildende Kunst. It passed to the collection of Fritz Thyssen in Mülheim, before it was acquired in 1965 by the Swiss billionaire Hans Heinrich Von Thyssen for the Museo Thyssen-Bornemisza, Madrid.

It was exhibited at the National Gallery of Art in Washington, D.C. in October 1981 while on loan from the Thyssen‐Bornemisza.
