= Alemanno =

Alemanno may refer to the following people:

Surname

- Alberto Alemanno, European law professor
- Germán Alemanno, Argentine football player
- Gianni Alemanno, Italian politician
- Matías Alemanno, Argentine rugby player
- Pietro Alemanno, Italian-Austrian renaissance painter
- Yohanan Alemanno (1435–1504) Italian philosopher

Given name

- Alemanno Adimari (1362–1422), Italian Catholic cardinal and archbishop
