= Exeter Madonna =

Painting by Petrus Christus

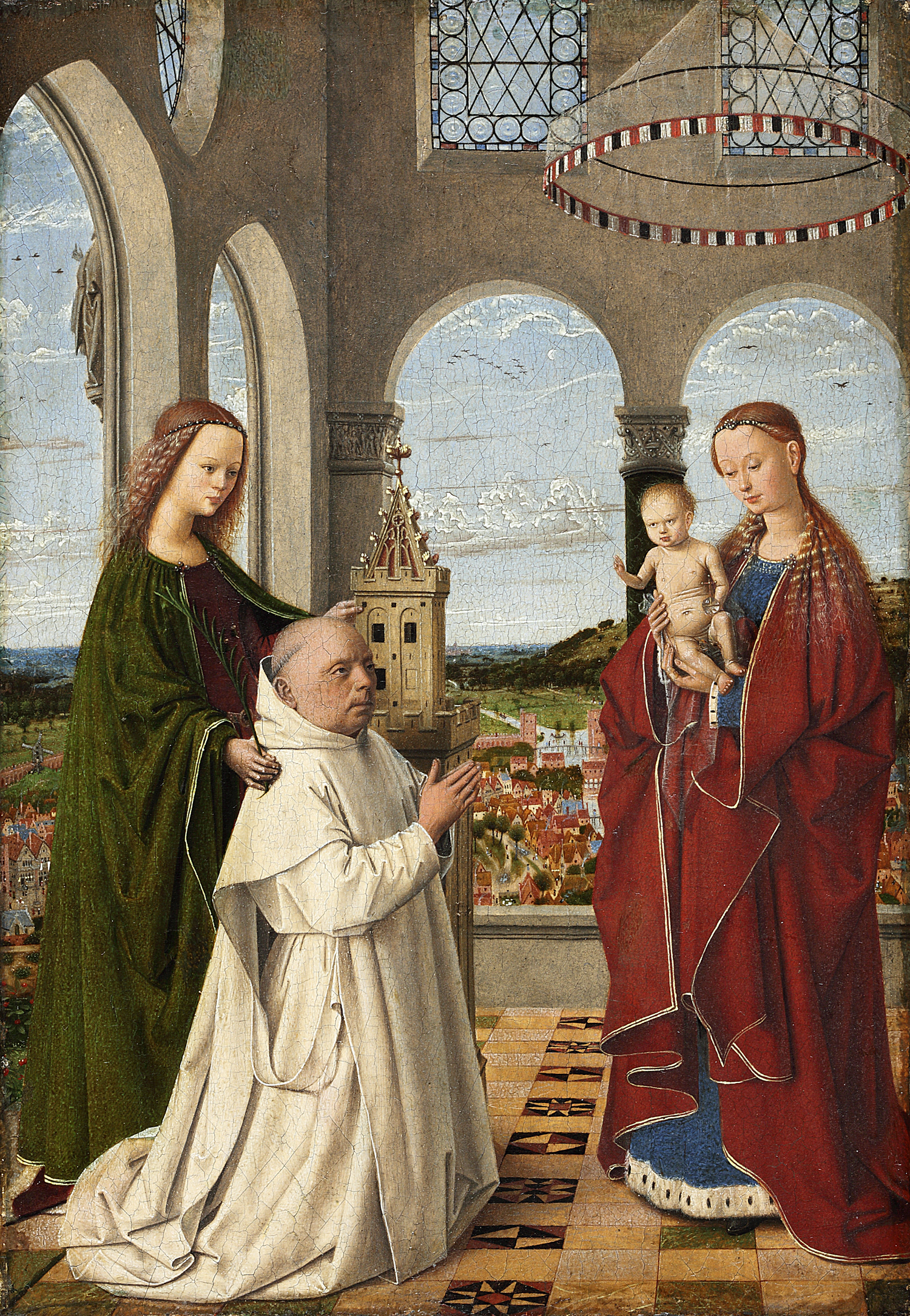
Exeter Madonna, c. 1450, 19.5 centimetres (7.7 in) x 14 centimetres (5.5 in), Gemäldegalerie, Berlin

The Exeter Madonna or Virgin and Child with Saint Barbara and Jan Vos are names given to a small oil-on-wood panel painting completed c. 1450 by the Early Netherlandish painter Petrus Christus. It shows Saint Barbara presenting a Carthusian monk identified as Jan Vos, to the Virgin Mary who holds the Christ Child in her arms. Its diminutive size suggests it was meant as a personal devotional piece.

The painting is set in a loggia reminiscent of the interior of Madonna of Chancellor Rolin by Jan van Eyck – complete with a row of floor tiles separating the earthly from the heavenly realms. The panel may have been a companion piece to van Eyck's late work Madonna of Jan Vos (c. 1441).

The attribution to Christus is today undisputed, although the date and circumstances of the commission are unknown. In the 17th century it was thought to be by van Eyck and sold as such by William Cecil, 3rd Marquess of Exeter when it was acquired by the Kaiser-Friedrich-Museum in 1888 and is now in Berlin's Gemäldegalerie.

== Commission ==
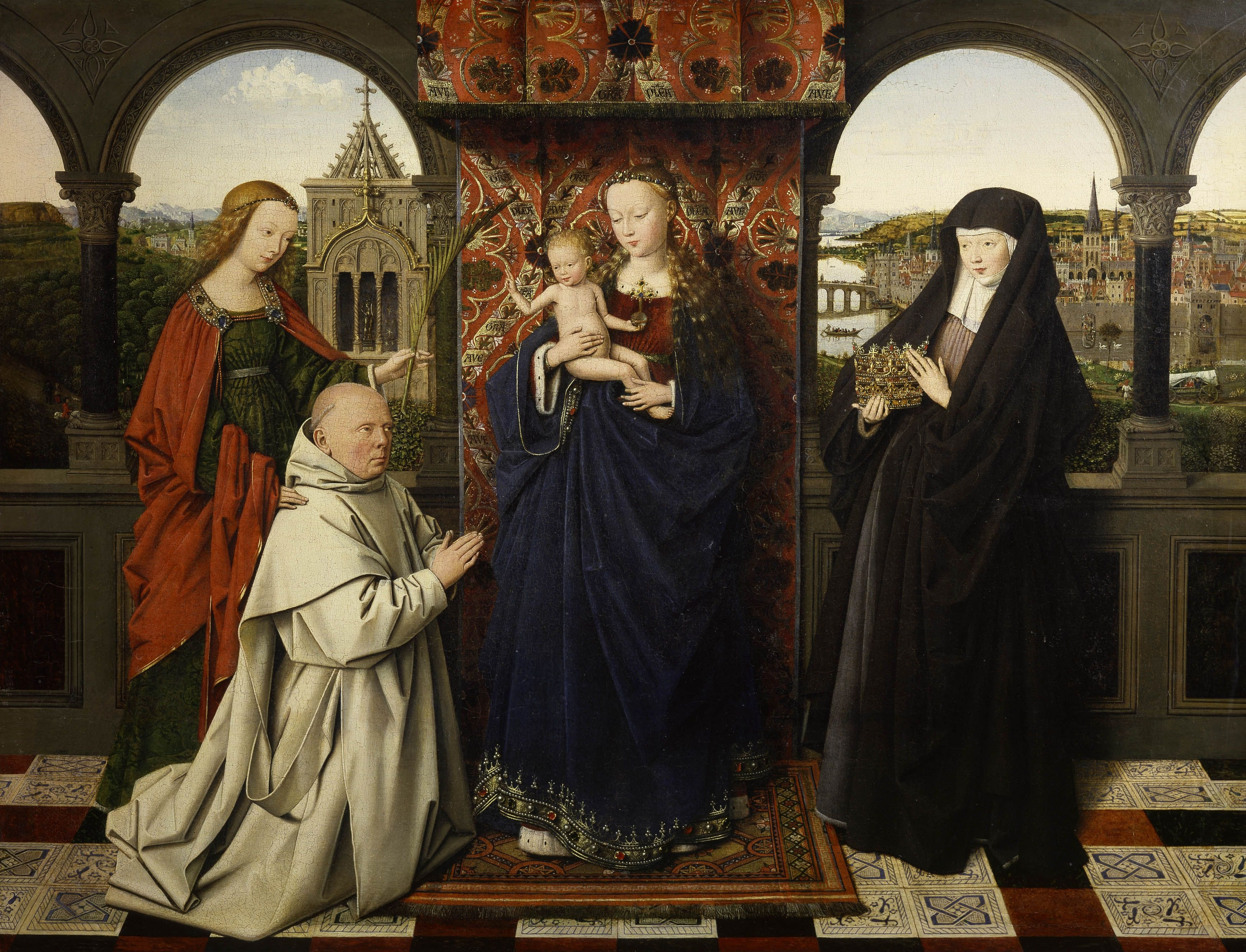
Madonna of Jan Vos, Jan van Eyck, c. 1441

The Carthusian monk in the painting was identified as Jan Vos in 1938 by the art historian H. J. J. Scholtens. Vos became prior of the Charterhouse of Val-de-Grace in 1441, around when he probably commissioned Jan van Eyck's Madonna of Jan Vos . Van Eyck died in 1441 and various theories have been put forth in regards to Petrus Christus's hand in that painting. The art historian Erwin Panofsky speculated that Christus finished the van Eyck. Given Christus's purchase of citizenship on July 6 1444, his ostensible arrival in Bruges at that time, and Vos's movements (he was absent from Bruges for a number of years), a more probable scenario is that the Exeter Madonna was commissioned as a portable devotional piece for Vos during his travels, or on his return to Bruges in the 1450s.

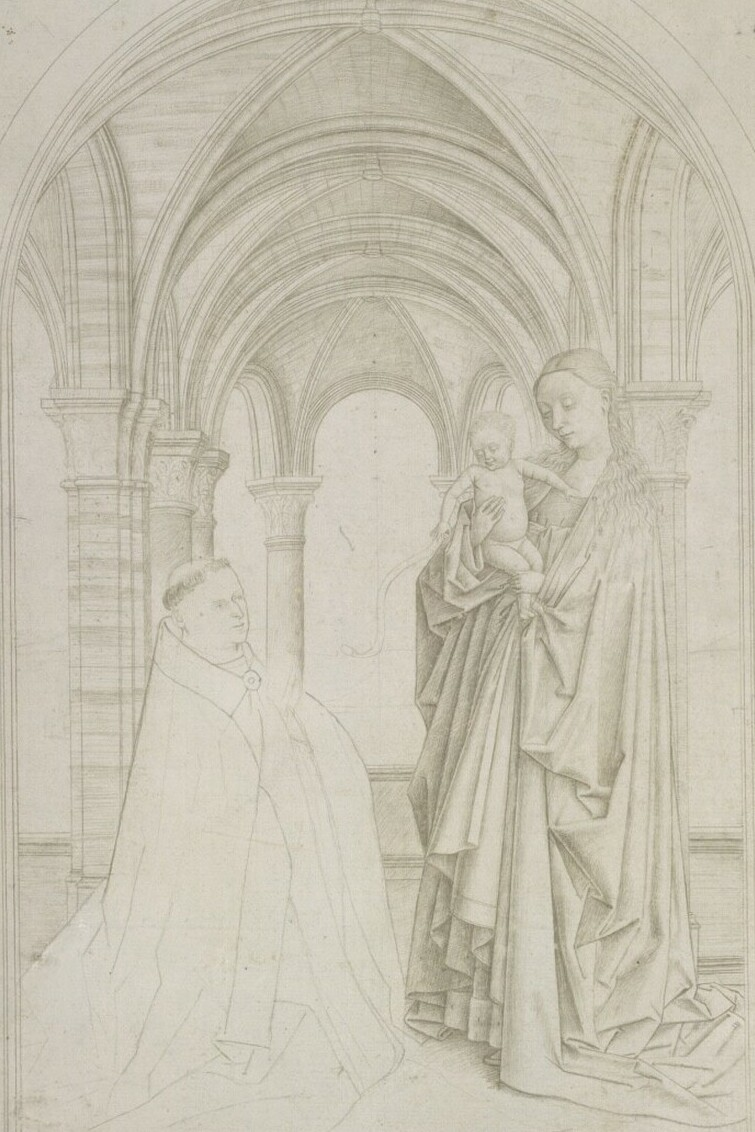
Silverpoint of Virgin and Child, after Jan van Eyck, now attributed to Petrus Christus

It is possible that Vos gave the Madonna of Jan Vos to Christus work from. Christus seems also to have used the now lost Madonna of Nicolas van Maelbeke as a source. Christus's rendition is a reinterpretion, rather than a direct copy of van Eyck's painting. Although Saint Barbara and Vos are in the same position in both paintings, the most obvious difference is the exclusion of Saint Elizabeth.

== Description ==
Saint Barbara presents Jan Vos to the Virgin Mary, who holds the Christ Child in her arms. She wears a red robe over a blue dress. The simple dress is only adorned with a single band of ermine fur at the hem. The attire and stance are similar in their simplicity to the Madonna of the Dry Tree by Petrus Christus. The depiction of the child is somewhat reminiscent of van Eyck's Dresden Triptych.

The figures are grouped in a high portico or loggia that opens to a city view and a background landscape. The tradition of a donor kneeling before the Virgin is common in Early Netherlandish art, with van Eyck's Madonna of Chancellor Rolin perhaps the most notable example, which Christus would have seen. Christus borrows that painting's line of floor tiles, which are intended to separate the earthly realm from the heavenly. The art historian Maryan Ainsworth writes that Christus pushed the figures into a corner, making it more intimate and utilising asymmetrical angles characteristic of his work. The art historian Joel Morgan Upton describes the arrangement as "strictly parallel" with a foreshortened foreground, in a "diagonal, asymmetrical placement...activated by a striking oblique placement of figures." The distinction between the figures and the space around them is characteristic of Christus's work, as is its one-point perspective. The viewer gazes on the Virgin from the same perspective as the kneeling monk, is drawn into the mood of the Sacra conversazione, which is emphasised by the richness of the world beyond the window.

The cityscape in the near background has been identified as Bruges in the 1450s, and is depicted with an unusually high degree of detail. Within the loggia, Saint Barbara's attribute of the tower resembles the Belfry of Bruges. To the exterior's far left in the square called the Huidenvettersplein people can be seen scurrying about, while and a tiny figure is visible seated a white horse. Through the centre window, the city's canals and small lake can be seen beneath a towered bridge.
