= Madonna of Humility (Gentile da Fabriano) =

Painting by Gentile da Fabriano

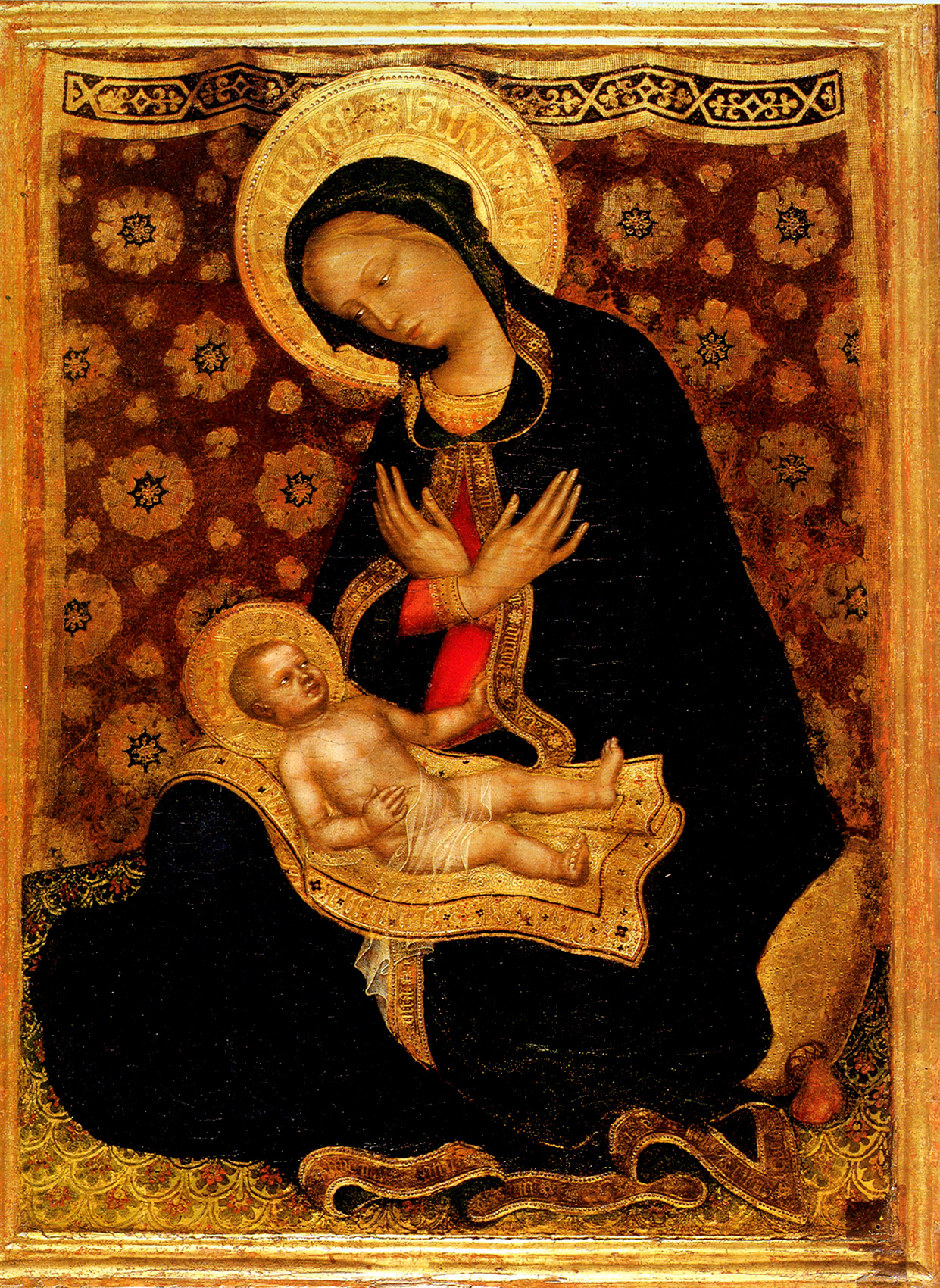
- Artist: Gentile da Fabriano
- Year: 1420–1423
- Medium: Tempera on panel
- Dimensions: 56 cm × 41 cm (22 in × 16 in)
- Location: Museo Nazionale di San Matteo, Pisa

The Madonna of Humility is a tempera-on-panel painting by the Italian late medieval artist Gentile da Fabriano, dating from around 1420–1423 and housed in the Museo nazionale di San Matteo, Pisa.

Once housed in the local Pious House of Misericordia, the work was commissioned under unknown circumstances; however, its modest scale suggests that it was intended for private devotion. It was perhaps ordered by cardinal Alemanno Adimari, archbishop of Pisa, who had his sepulchre in the Roman church of Santa Maria Nova decorated by Gentile (a lost work mentioned by late Renaissance art biographer Giorgio Vasari).

== Description ==
The Madonna of Humility, with the Virgin sitting on a cushion over the ground, was a common theme in early 15th century western painting. She is holding the Child on her knees, above a richly decorated gilt cloth. The fine golden background, the rendering of the clothes and other technical detail link the panel to the artist's Florentine period, including works such as the Adoration of the Magi (1423) and (in particular for the posture of the Child) the Adoration of the Child.

A work with the same composition was executed by Gentile da Fabriano in 1420–1421, although in it the Virgin is portrayed frontally.

The mantle of the Virgin has on the border the inscription "AVE M[A]T[ER] DIEGNA [D]EI", while on the edge of the cloth on which the Child lies are Arabic characters, which have been read as the Quran Shahada (لا إله إلا الله - Lā ilāha illa Allāh). The presence of such an element has not been explained, and it could be an exotic addition made without knowing the exact meaning of the original verse.

== Sources ==
- Minardi, Mauro (2005). Gentile da Fabriano. Milan: RCS.
