= Virgin and Child with the Infant John the Baptist (Botticelli, Cleveland) =

Painting by Sandro Botticelli and his workshop

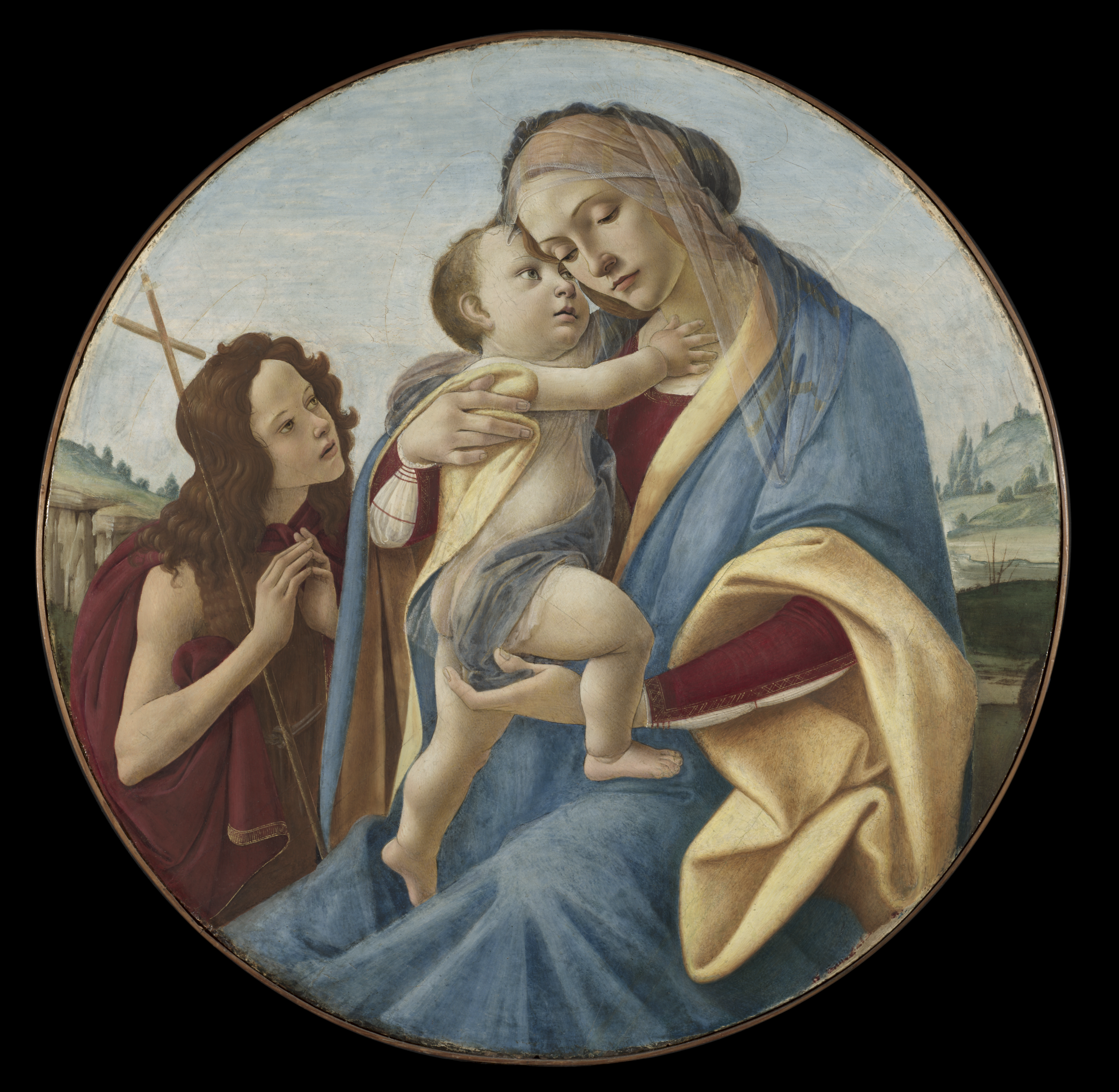
- Year: c. 1490
- Medium: Tempera and oil on wood
- Dimensions: 68 cm (27 in)
- Owner: Ehrich Galleries
- Accession: 1970.160

The Virgin and Child with the Infant John the Baptist is a painting of c. 1490 by the Italian Renaissance painter Sandro Botticelli and his workshop. It is housed in the Cleveland Museum of Art.

The United States Postal Service used the painting for a 2008 Christmas stamp.

== Attribution ==
There has been some dispute as to whether Botticelli or his pupil Filippino Lippi produced this work. The painting is generally attributed to Botticelli, as it is similar to his other works of the time. The Cleveland Museum of Art attributes the painting to Botticelli and his workshop.

== See also ==
- List of works by Sandro Botticelli
