= Madonna of Veveri =

Painting by the Master of Vyšší Brod

Madona of Veveří
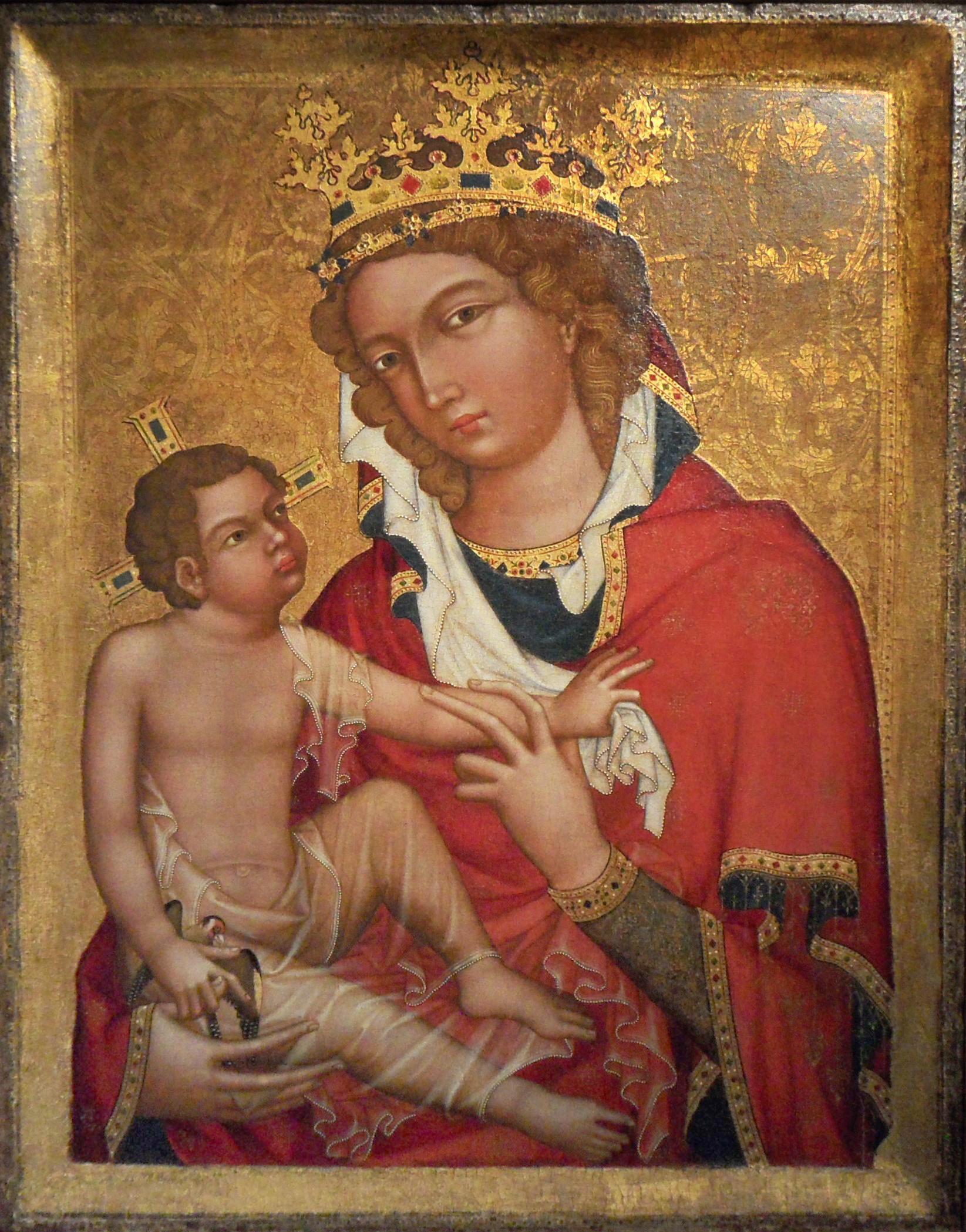
- Artist: Master of Vyšší Brod
- Year: 1344 - 1350
- Type: Tempera and gold on panel
- Dimensions: 79,5 cm × 62,5 cm (313 in × 246 in)
- Location: Diocesan Museum Brno; Brno

The Veveri Madonna, also called the Madonna of Veveri (Czech: Madona z Veveří, German: Madonna von Eichhorn ), is an tempera painting by the unknown Moravian, Bohemian (or probably Italian) (active in Bohemian lands) artist generally called Master of Vyšší Brod. The altarpiece was commissioned after 1344 by Margrave John Henry of Luxembourg for the romanesque church of Assumption of Our Lady, In the neighborhood of royal Veveří castle in Brno, Moravia, Czech Republic. Exhibited in Diocesan Museum in Brno. The panel was one of the first Madonnas painted by the artist. Albert Kutal a Czech scholar called it "a truly rare and extraordinary work".

== Composition ==
The painting is in tempera on pine wood panel, canvas-covered with gently pastiglia stucco relief decoration and of additional gold metal slices, measures 79,5 cm by 62,5 cm. Madonna, Mary is seen half-figure with the Child in her lap, holding the Christ Child. The latter's left hand is touching his mother's, while under the right hand holds a bird – goldfinch, (because of the thistle seeds the goldfinch often eats, in Christian symbolism the goldfinch is associated with Christ's Passion and his crown of thorns). The Virgin Mary wears double crown on uncovered loose hair, without a veil. Some Byzantine-Italian traces notwithstanding, the painting shows a further step in the assimilation of Italian influences, which are adapted in an individually and stylistically balanced manner.

== Painting materials ==
Pigment analysis of Master of Vyšší Brod's masterpiece reveals the usual pigments of the high gothic period such as ferric oxide mixed with orpiment in the red drapery on top of the painting, natural ultramarine mixed with lead white in the blue robe of Madonna (inside).

== Exhibited ==
- Brno 7. 10 1935 – 31. 3. 1936, Gotické umění na Moravě a ve Slezsku (The Gothic Art in Moravia and Silesia), Galerie Moravského zemského muzea
- Prague 1939, Výstava restaurované madony (The restored Madonna´s), National Gallery in Prague
- Paris 1957, L´art ancien en Tchecoslovaquie, Musée des arts décoratifs, Louvre
- Brussels 1966, Les Primitifs de Bohême, Palais des Beaux-arts de Bruxelles
- Rotterdam 8. 7. – 11. 9. 1966, De Boheemse Primitiven: Gotische kunst in Tsjechoslowakije, Museum Boijmans Van Beuningen
- Cologne 1987 Schöne Madonnen, Schnütgen Museum
- New York 20. 9.2005 – 3. 2. 2006, Medieval Bohemian Art, The Metropolitan Museum of Art
- Prague 1940 – 6. 3. 2016, Stálá výstava Středověké umění v Čechách a střední Evropa 1200–1550, Národní galerie Praha
- Olomouc 13. 2. – 11. 5. 2014, Gotické Madony na lvu - Splendor et Virtus Reginae Coeli, Arcidiecézní muzeum Olomouc
- Brno 7. 3. 2016 – stil, Vita Christi, Diocesan museum Brno
