= Madonna of the Red Cherubim =

1485 painting by Giovanni Bellini

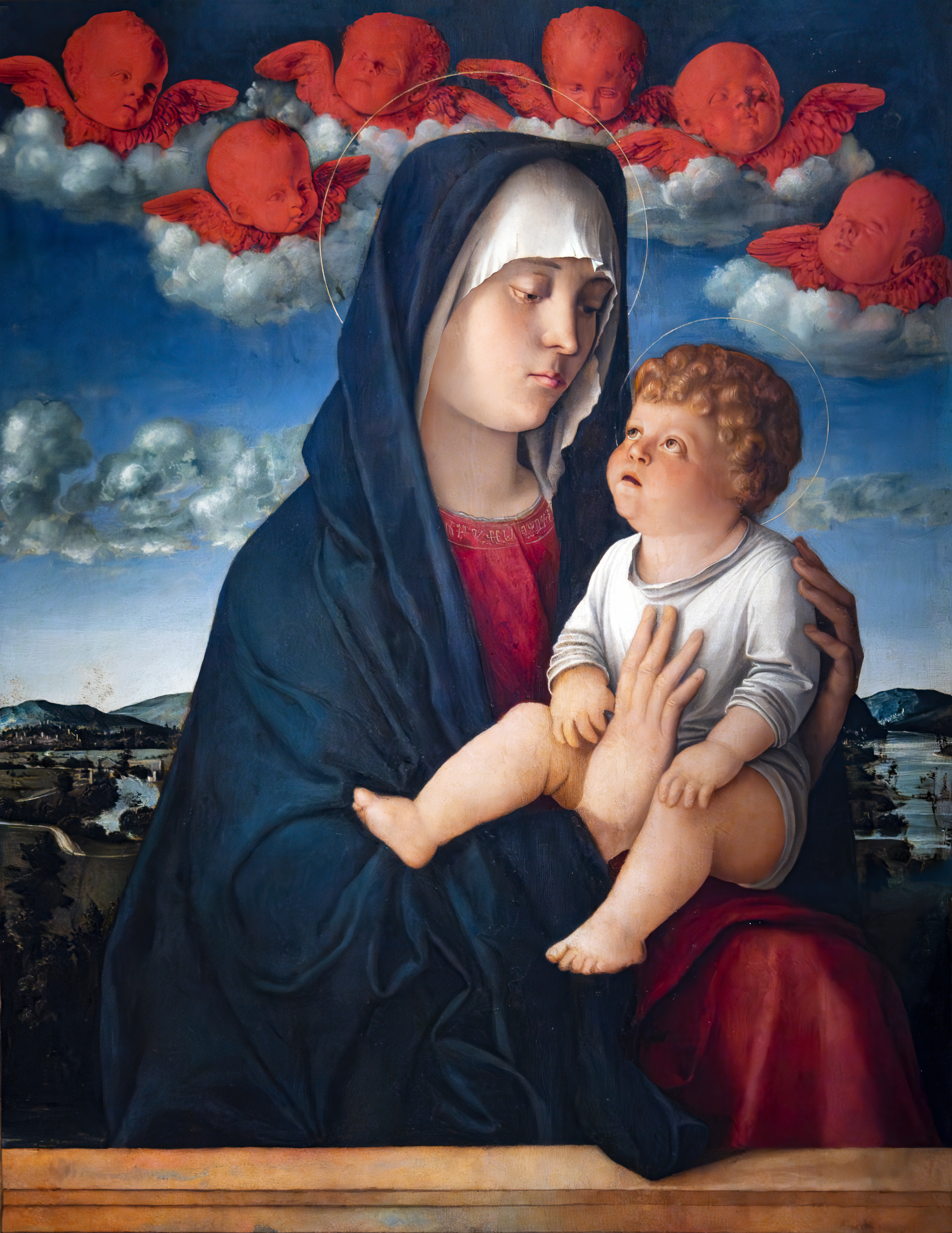
- Artist: Giovanni Bellini
- Year: c. 1485
- Medium: Oil on panel
- Dimensions: 77 cm × 60 cm (30 in × 24 in)
- Location: Gallerie dell'Accademia, Venice

The Madonna of the Red Cherubim is an oil-on-panel painting by Italian Renaissance artist Giovanni Bellini, completed around 1485.

Stylistic elements such as the child on one of the Virgin's knees, and the mutual glance, suggest that the work was based on Bellini's Alzano Madonna in the Accademia Carrara.

== Description ==
The Virgin and Child are portrayed in the foreground, before a typical landscape with towers, castles and a fluvial inlet with a small boat.

The bright sky features a series of red cherubim which give their name to the picture. Also typical of Bellini is the parapet in the lower part, although this time he did not add the cartouche with the signature.

== See also ==
- Madonna of the Small Trees

== Sources ==
- Olivari, Mariolina (2007). "Giovanni Bellini". Pittori del Rinascimento. Florence: Scala. ISBN 888117099X.
