= Madonna and Child Kissing =

Painting by Quentin Matsys

Madonna and Child
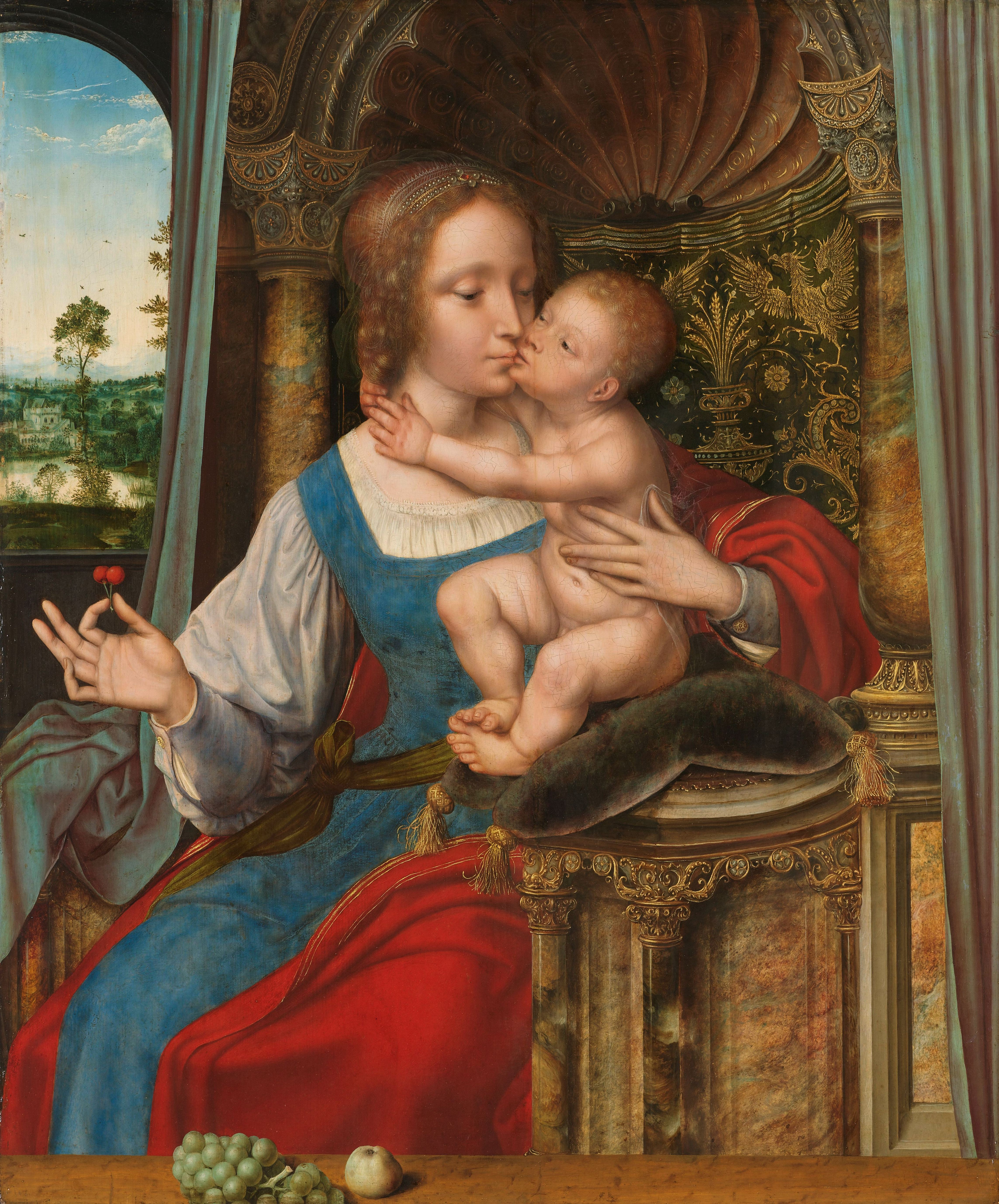
- Artist: Quentin Matsys
- Year: circa 1525–1530
- Medium: Oil on panel
- Dimensions: 75.4 cm × 62.9 cm (29.7 in × 24.8 in)
- Location: Mauritshuis, The Hague

Madonna and Child Kissing is a 1520s oil on panel painting by the Flemish renaissance artist Quentin Matsys in the collection of the Rijksmuseum, Amsterdam, on loan to the Mauritshuis.

== Painting ==
Mary, holding two cherries with her right hand, sits kissing her child who sits next to her on a pedestal inside a richly decorated throne with a view of a castle on a river beyond. Lying on a banister in the foreground are a bunch of grapes (referring to the wine of the Eucharist) and an apple (symbol of the Fall of Man).

There are several known versions of this painting, made popular by a 1628 painting by Willem van Haecht of The Gallery of Cornelis van der Geest. That Madonna of the Cherries painting was the subject of an anecdote published in 1648 by Frans Fickaert (1614–1654) in which he stated that on 23 August 1615, while on a visit, the Archduke attempted to buy it from Van der Geest but was refused. He claimed it was in the possession of Van der Geest who declined an offer to purchase it by Albert of Austria. Recent dendrochronology has shown that the wood of the panel was felled at the latest in 1502. Though this panel could have been ready for use by 1513, a date after 1527 is more likely. Fickaert may have been mistaken in the year, or possibly this panel is not the original and was copied by the artist based on the story, or perhaps even because of its featured status in the Haecht painting and the enthusiasm Van der Geest had for Matsys. Van der Geest celebrated the hundredth anniversary of Matsys' death by having his bones re-interred in the Antwerp Cathedral with the inscription Connubial bliss turned a blacksmith into Apelles.

== Provenance ==
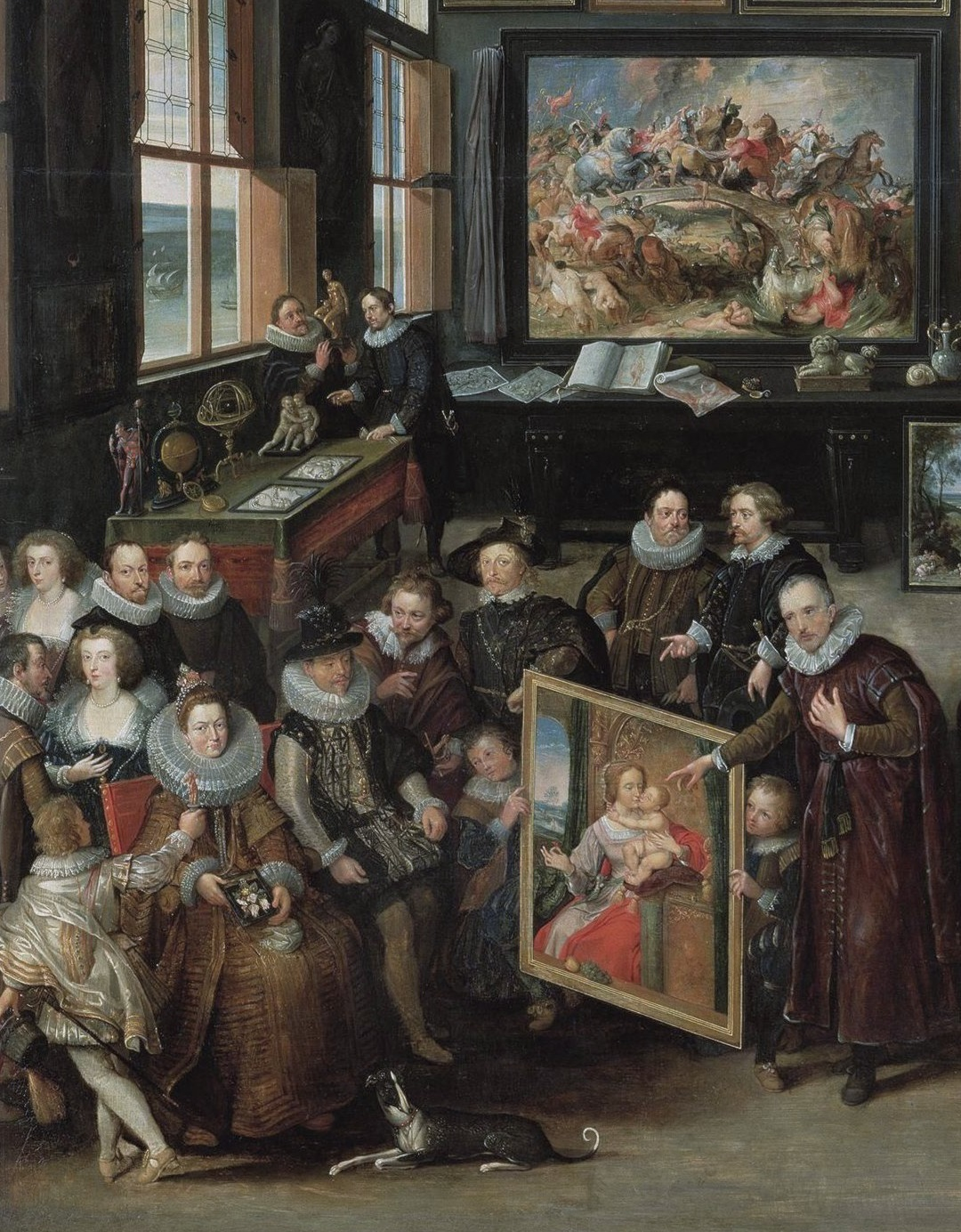
Detail of the Van Haecht painting featuring the Madonna of the Cherries, with Van der Geest pointing to the Madonna and looking at the viewer and Albert and Isabella seated before it

The painting was in the collection of Princess Albertine Agnes of Nassau (1634–1696), at the Frisian Stadholder's Court, Leeuwarden, and a century later was appropriated for the national collection from Het Loo Palace to the Rijksmuseum, then in The Hague, on 18 September 1798. The appropriation of art from the stadtholder's collection was a tactical move to prevent the abduction of more national treasure to Paris as had happened with the Prince William V Gallery in 1795. The painting has been in the national collection owned by the Rijksmuseum ever since, and has been on loan to the Mauritshuis since 1948.

Other known versions:

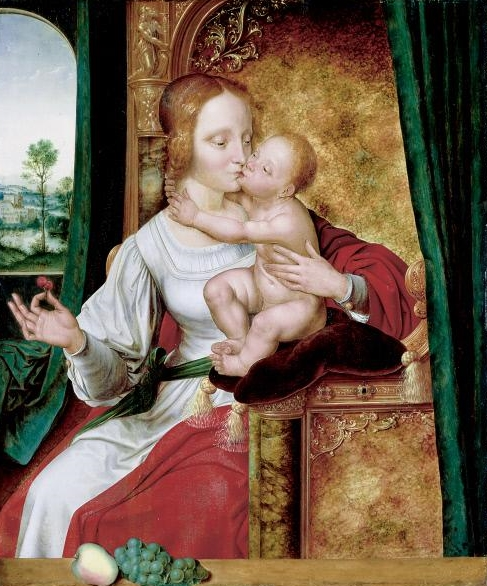
The Madonna of the Cherries, John and Mable Ringling Museum of Art (acquired in 1936)

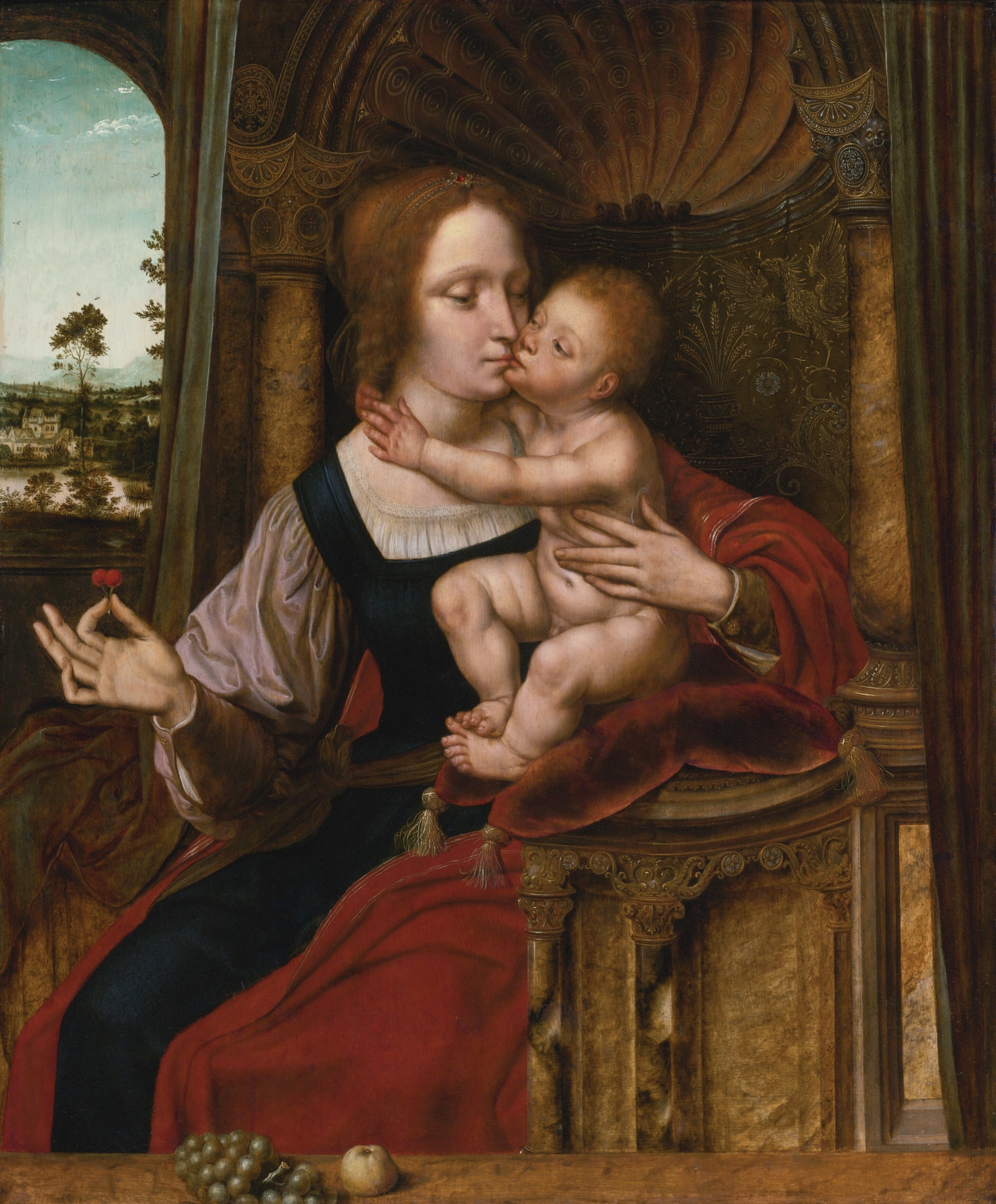
The Madonna of the Cherries, version previously attributed to Bernaert van Orley and sold 29 January 2015

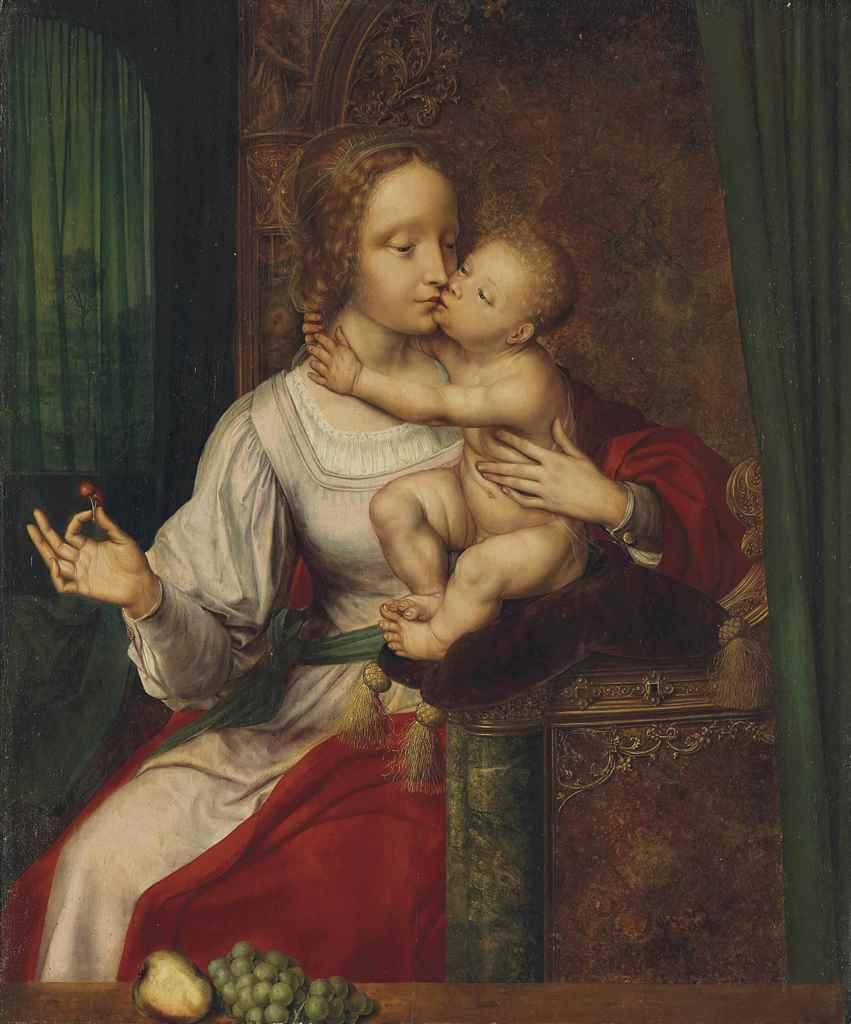
The Madonna of the Cherries, version previously attributed to Metsys and sold 9 July 2015 for £254,500

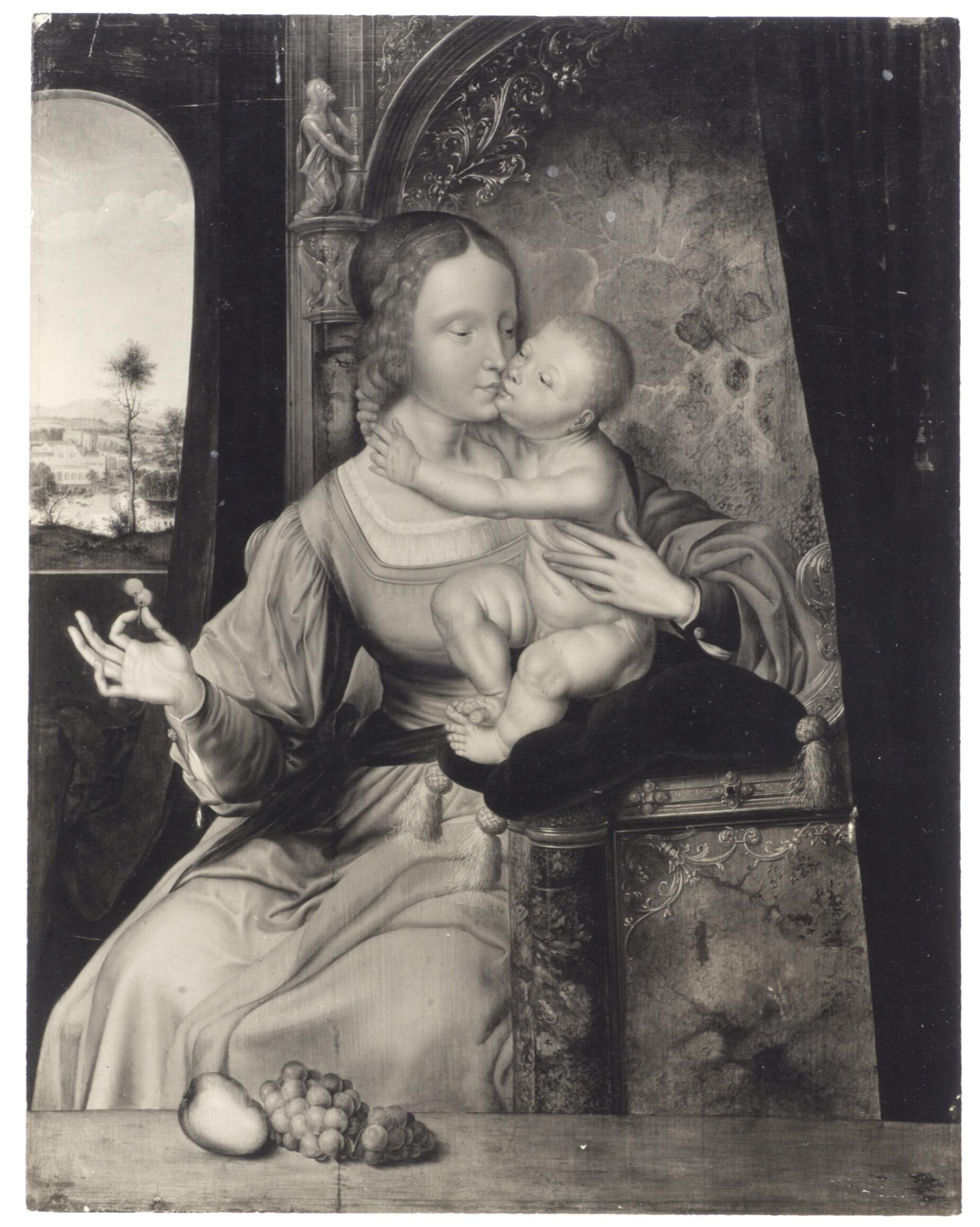
Version sold in 1931 from the collection of Prince Friedrich Leopold of Prussia

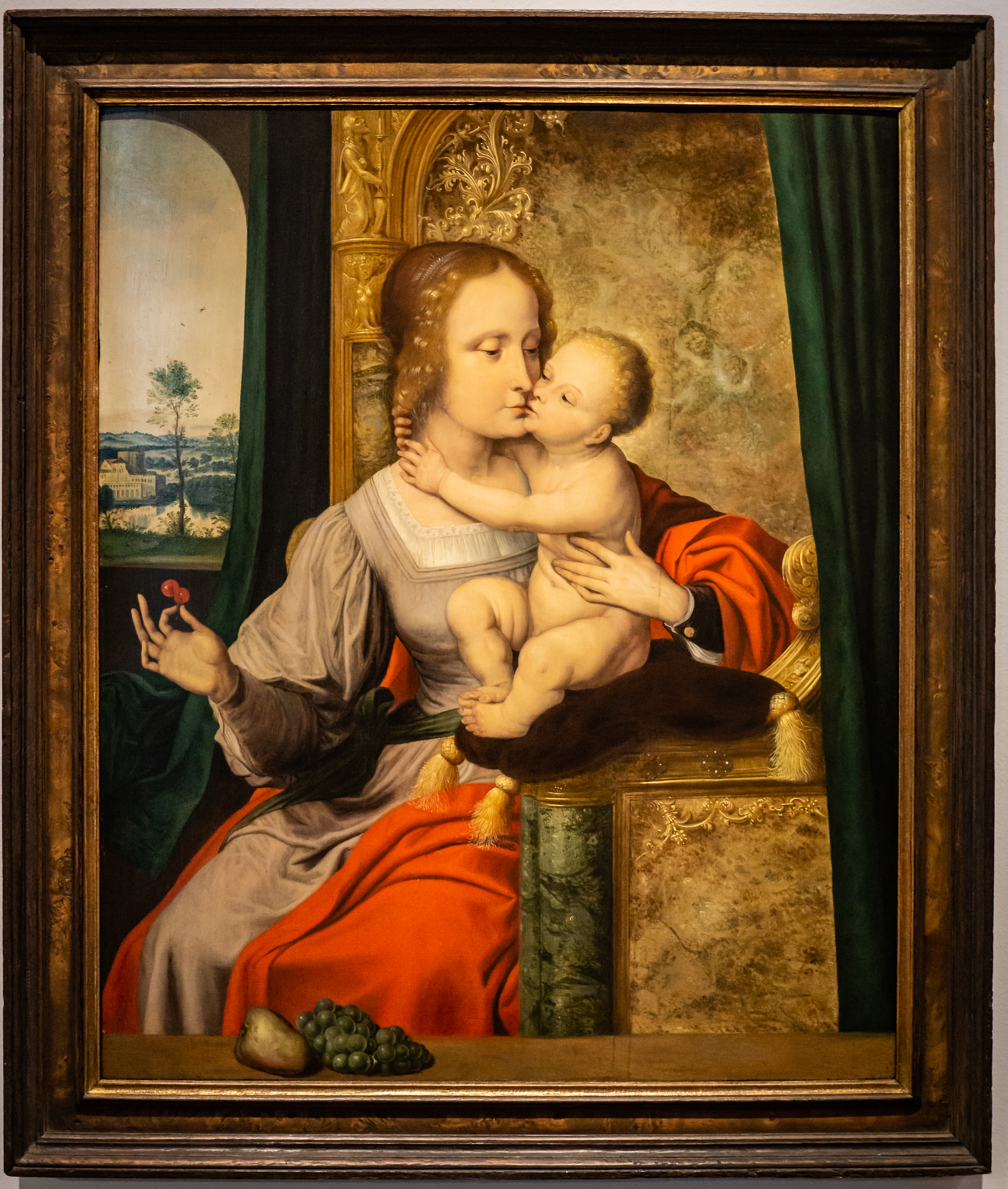
Madonna mit den Kirschen, Westphalian State Museum of Art and Cultural History
