= Alzano Madonna =

Painting by Giovanni Bellini

Madonna with Child
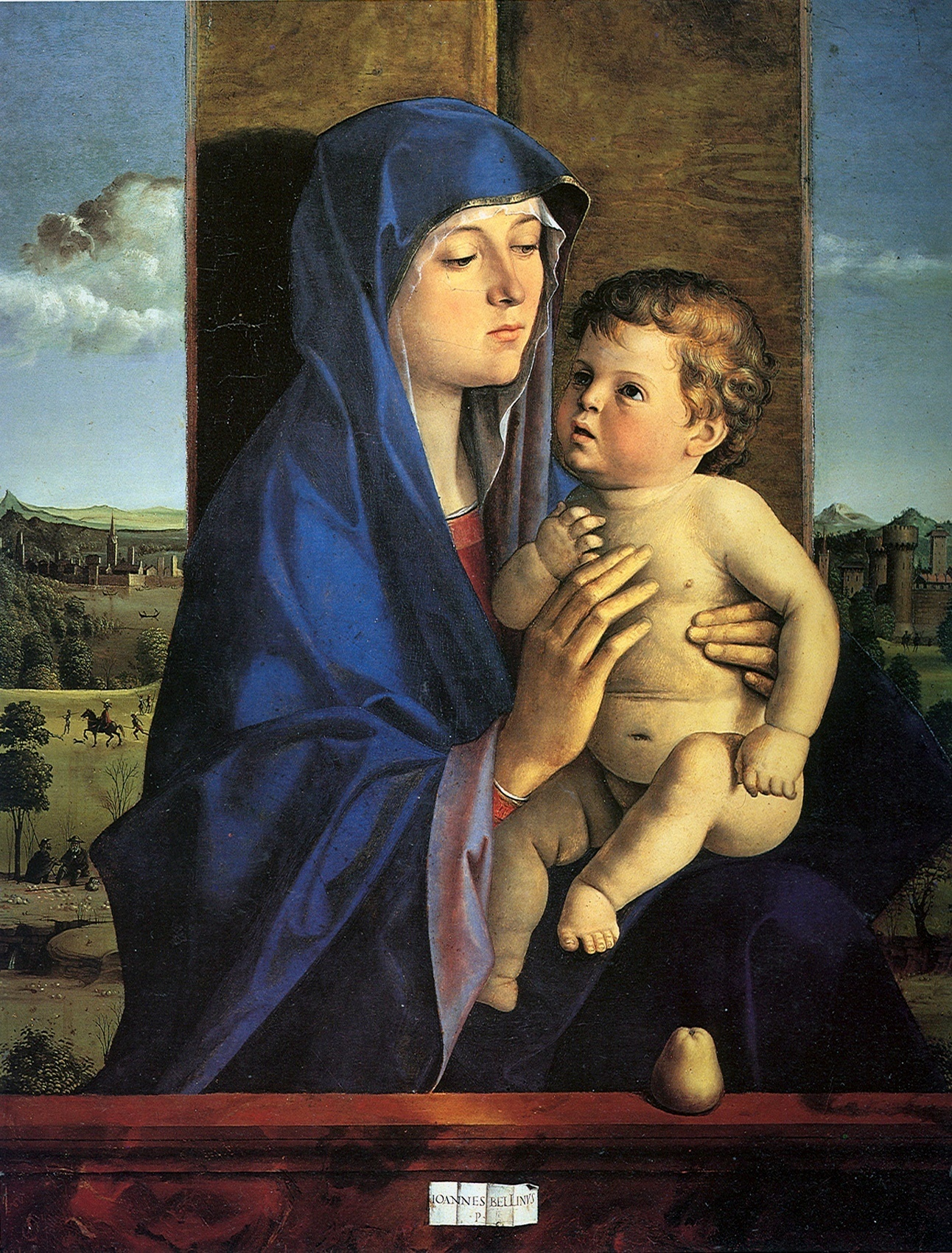
- Artist: Giovanni Bellini
- Year: c. 1485
- Medium: Oil on panel
- Dimensions: 83 cm × 66 cm (33 in × 26 in)
- Location: Accademia Carrara, Bergamo

The Madonna with Child, or Alzano Madonna, sometimes known as Madonna of the Pear, is an oil-on-panel painting by Italian Renaissance artist Giovanni Bellini, executed around 1485.

== History ==
The work has been in Bergamo since as early as the 16th century, where it likely arrived as part of the dowry of Lucrezia Agliardi, who had been abbess in the monastery of Alzano Lombardo, whence the name.

After several passages of ownership, in 1891 it was donated to the current museum.

== Description ==
In this picture, Bellini represented the traditional theme of Mary and Child Jesus. Behind them is a hanging tapestry resembling the thrones with baldachin that were common in the contemporary sacred conversations. At the sides are a landscape with towers, castles and small figures, as typical in the artist's production.

In the foreground is a red marble parapet where is the usual cartouche with Bellini's signature. There is also a fruit, perhaps a reference to the original sin, or an emblem of the Virgin derived from holy books or hymns. The fruit is traditionally regarded as a pear, but is actually a cow-nose apple.

This Madonna is generally considered a model of later works, such as the Madonna of the Red Cherubims or the Madonna of the Small Trees, both in the Galeria dell'Academia, Venice.

== See also ==
- List of works by Giovanni Bellini
