= Madonna del Padiglione (Botticelli) =

Painting by Sandro Botticelli

Madonna and Child with Three Angels
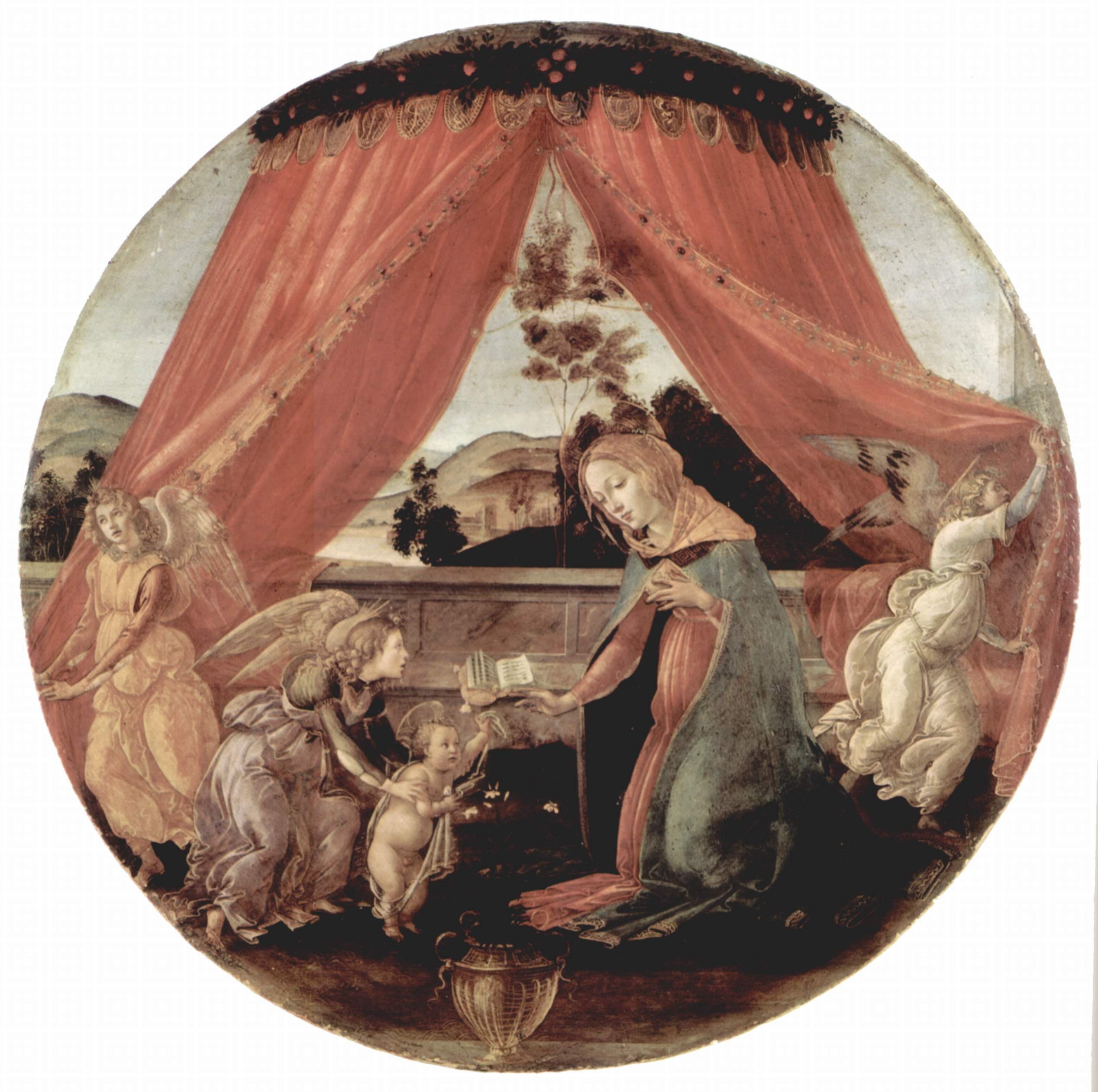
- Artist: Sandro Botticelli
- Year: c. 1493
- Medium: Tempera on panel
- Dimensions: 65 cm × 65 cm (26 in × 26 in); 65 cm diameter (26 in)
- Location: Pinacoteca Ambrosiana, Milan

The Madonna and Child with Three Angels (also known as Madonna del Padiglione) is a painting by the Italian Renaissance master Sandro Botticelli, executed around 1493. It is housed in the Pinacoteca Ambrosiana of Milan.

The Virgin Mary is portrayed with her right hand expressing milk from her exposed breast and gesturing to the Child, the latter being supported by an angel. The Italian name (padiglione meaning "pavilion") derives from the rich baldachin over the scene. The open book on a small prie-dieu is a familiar symbol of Christ, the "word [of God] made flesh" (John 1:14) and the Christ child gestures toward the book to signal his identity.

The "pavilion" is a reference to the same verse in Gospel of John: "The word became flesh and dwelt among us." In the Greek language of the gospel, the word "dwelt" actually means "tented," a reference to the book of Exodus in the Old Testament where God's glory entered the tabernacle in the wilderness of Sinai: "Then the cloud covered the tent of meeting, and the glory of the Lord filled the tabernacle" (Exodus 40:34). The tabernacle was a movable tent shrine created according to God's directions to hold the Ark of the Covenant, the sacred container of the Ten Commandments, God's words. In this painting, the Virgin Mary is the new Ark of the Covenant since she, like the Ark, contained the Word of God (Leith, 117). The book and the open tent/pavilion signify the revelation that the Old Testament prophecy has been fulfilled in the birth of the Christ Child to the Virgin.

== See also ==
- List of works by Sandro Botticelli
