= Enthroned Virgin and Child (English, The Cloisters) =

Statuette in elephant ivory dated to between 1290 and 1300

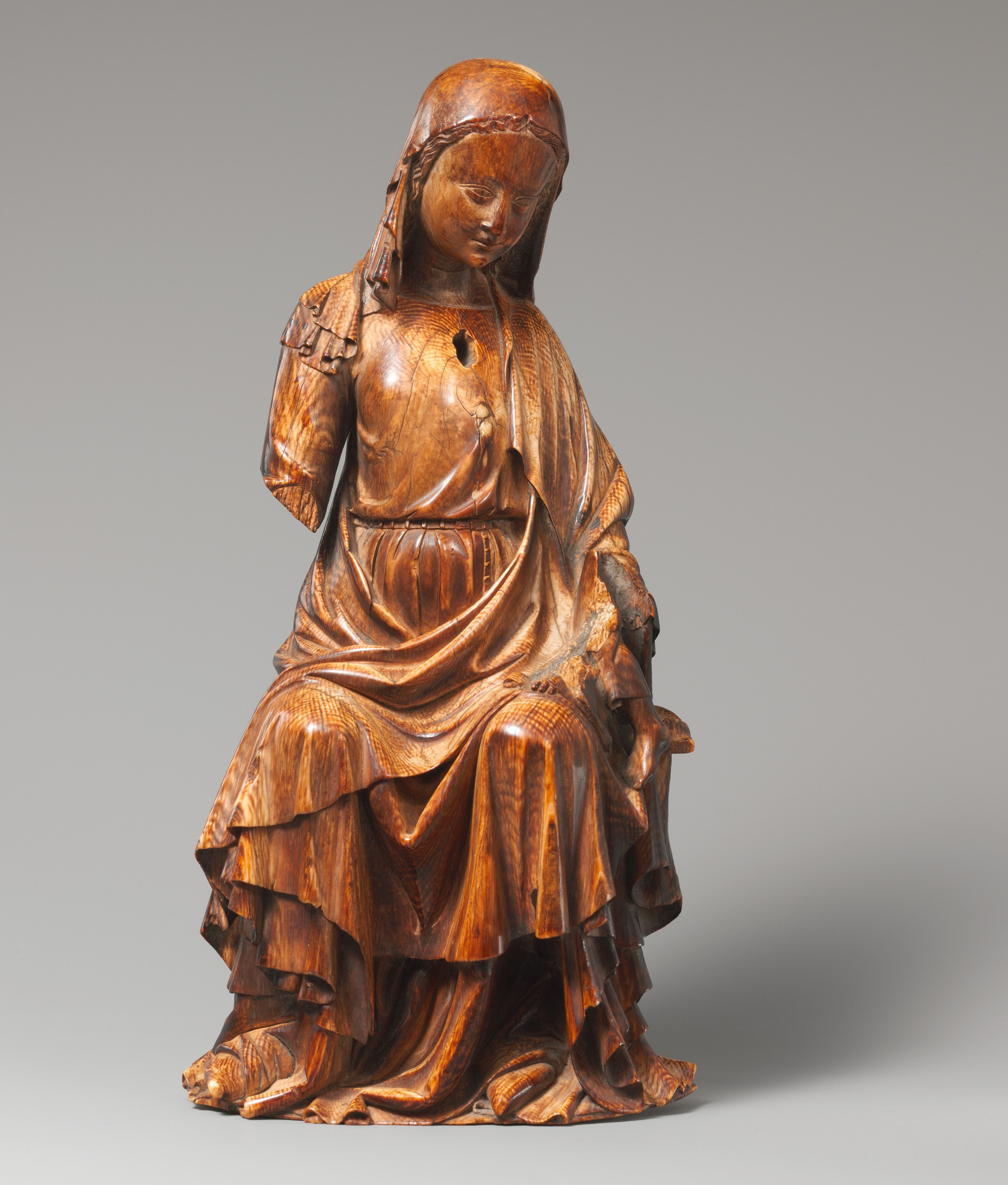
Enthroned Virgin and Child, 27.3 x 13.5 x 9.6cm. Metropolitan Museum of Art, New York

The Enthroned Virgin and Child is a statuette in elephant ivory dated to between 1290 and 1300, now at The Cloisters in New York. Originating probably from London, certainly English, it is today badly damaged. It originally showed a seated Virgin Mary, holding the child Christ, most of whose body is now lost, but at one time was perched on her left knee looking upwards. Only the toes of his left foot and part of his left leg and foot survive. It has a reddish-brown appearance, probably from a staining agent used in restoration.

Its style is associated with the court of Edward I of England, especially in it monumentality, the Virgins' facial type, and the cascading folds of drapery. It was created near the height of the late medieval cult of the Virgin, and in keeping, emphasises her humanity, warmth and accessibility; in particular she turns slightly to her left to face her son. It is a rare English example of this type, similar contemporary statuettes are more common in French art. Yet it is of the highest quality; the art historian William Wixom wrote that "the face is exquisitely rendered, the slight twist of the figure is subtle and eloquent, as the Virgin turns to the Child, and the deep drapery folds, some paper thin, are controlled and elegant".

The statuette was created for personal devotion and was once formed part of a larger, now lost piece, perhaps an architectural canopy or an ivory tabernacle shrine. Its relatively large size indicates it may have been placed in a setting of silver or silver gilt. That it was part of a larger piece is reinforced by the fact that her back is carved in low-relief folds (see side view, above), suggesting that she was not intended to be viewed from behind.

Its earliest known provenance is in the collection of Georges J. Demotte from 1877 to 1923. Thereafter it passed to John Hunt of County Dublin, Ireland, until 1979. That year it passed to the Metropolitan Museum of Art.

== Sources ==
- Kleinbauer, Walter Eugene. "Recent Major Acquisitions of Medieval Art by American Museums." Gesta 19, no. 1, 1980
- Porter, Dean. "Ivory Carving in Later Medieval England, 1200–1400." State University of New York, Binghamton, 1974
- Stratford, Neil. "Glastonbury and Two Gothic Ivories in the United States." Studies in Medieval Sculpture, Volume 3. London: Society of Antiquaries of London, 1983
- Wixom, William. "Medieval Sculpture at The Cloisters". The Metropolitan Museum of Art Bulletin, volume 46, no. 3, Winter, 1988–1989
