= Madonna of Jan Vos =

Painting by Jan van Eyck

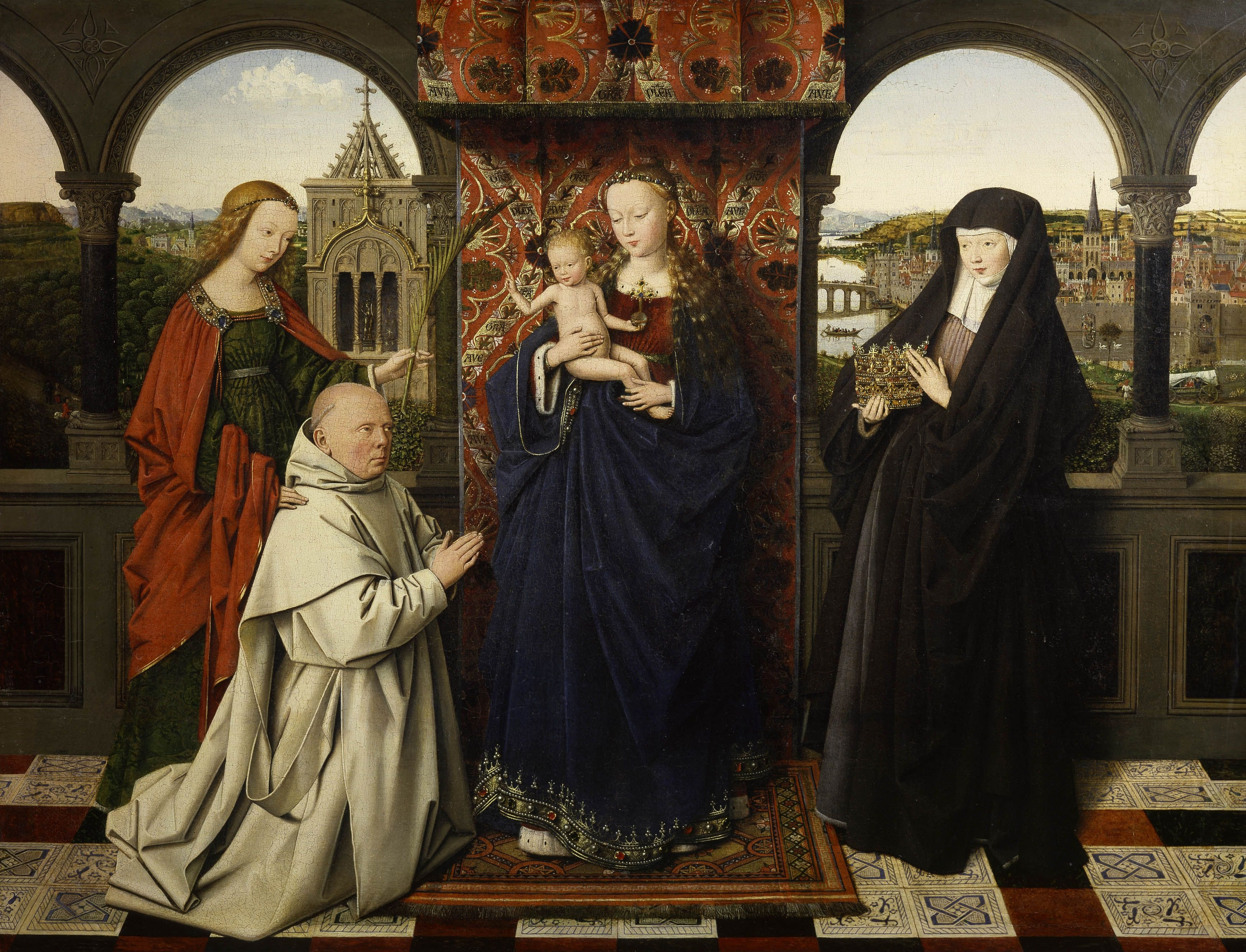
Virgin and Child, with Saints and Donor, 47.3 cm × 61.3 cm, early 1440s. Frick Collection, New York. Left to right: Saint Barbara, Jan Vos, Virgin and Child, Saint Elizabeth of Hungary

The Madonna of Jan Vos (also known as Virgin and Child, with Saints and Donor) is a small oil panel painting begun by the Early Netherlandish artist Jan van Eyck c. 1441 and finished by his workshop after his death in 1442. As he died during the period of its completion, it is generally considered to be his last work.

The panel was commissioned by Jan Vos, who, in March 1441, took office near Bruges as prior of a Carthusian Monastery, the earliest date that he could have instructed van Eyck. Art historians generally agree that van Eyck is responsible for painting the central Madonna and Child, and conceiving the overall design, while the ancillary figures and details of the background were completed c. 1443 by a member of his workshop who borrowed freely from earlier van Eyck paintings. It was acquired in 1954 by the Frick museum, New York.

== Description ==
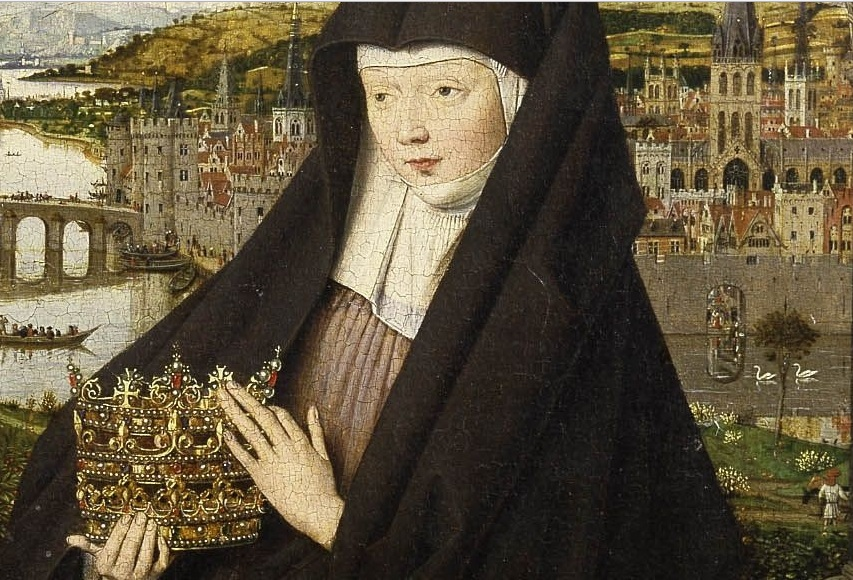
Detail showing Elizabeth and cityscape with swans

Mary stands in majesty, holding the child Christ and standing on an oriental carpet. Around her are Saint Barbara, standing before the tower in which she was prisoned, Saint Elizabeth of Hungary dressed in a nun's habit, and the donor Jan Vos (d. 1462), depicted as a Carthusian monk kneeling in prayer. A statue of the deity Mars can be seen through the window of Barbara's tower. Vos' pose and modeling closely resembles the donors in both van Eyck's portraits of Nicolas Rolin in the Madonna of Chancellor Rolin and Joris van der Paele in the Virgin and Child with Canon van der Paele (the latter also contains a depiction of Saint Barbara). This fact, and the similarity of the landscape to that in a number of his earlier portraits has led to a general consensus among art historians that aspects of the panel are a pastiche of van Eyckian motifs, and that the painting was finished by a talented workshop member. Evidence suggests that the passages by van Eyck hand are mostly around the central Virgin and Child.

The figures are positioned in an exterior loggia bounded by a series of arcades, and before an expansive and very van Eyckian landscape. Painted inscriptions woven into the canopy read AVE GRA[TIA] PLE[N]A (Hail Mary full of grace). Art historians have attempted to identify both the city and cathedral, but as with most of van Eyck's backgrounds, they are probably imaginary.

== Exeter Madonna ==
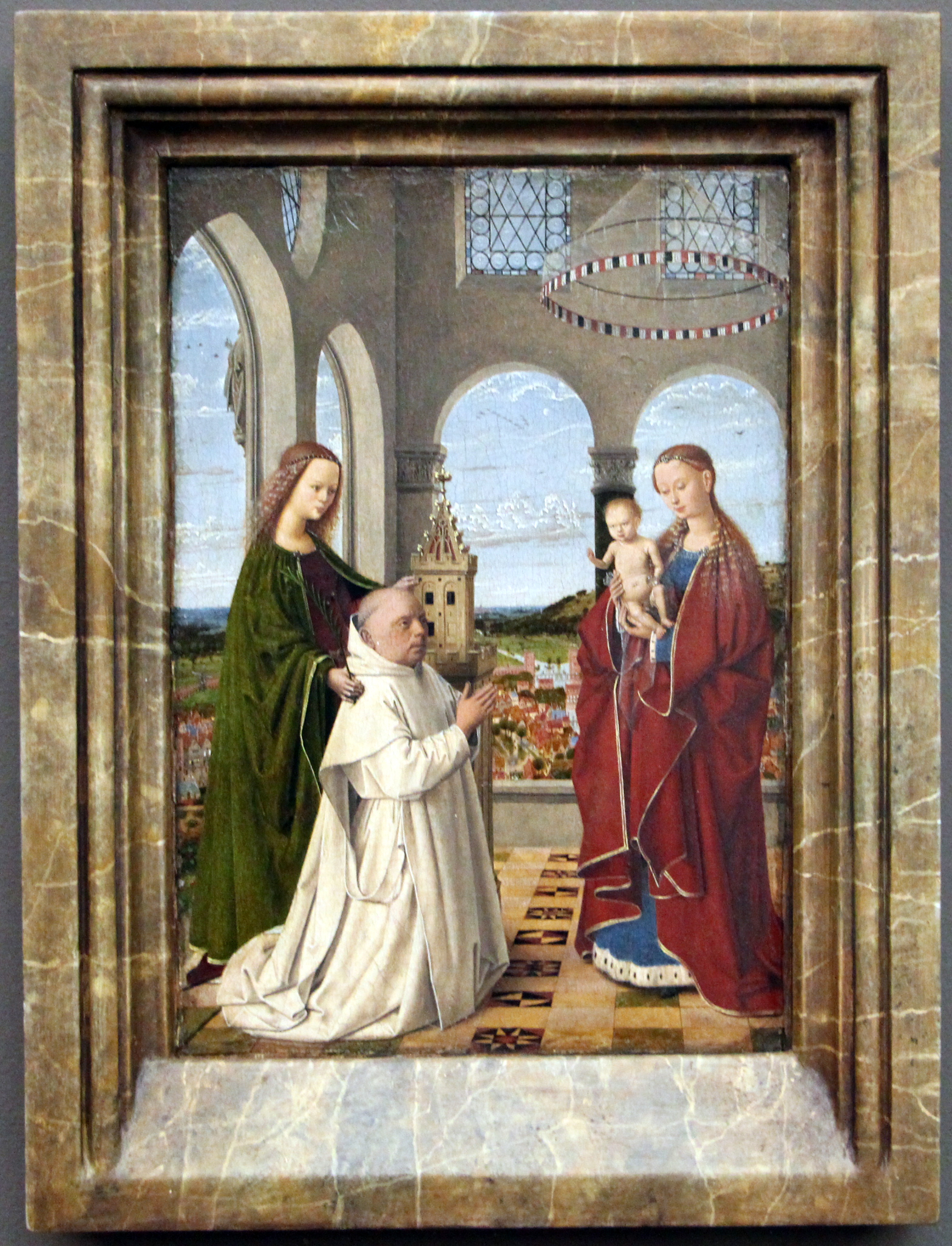
The Exeter Madonna, Petrus Christus, c. 1450. Gemäldegalerie, Berlin

Petrus Christus's Exeter Madonna was commissioned byafter 1450, by which time van Eyck's workshop had ceased operation. Christus' panel can be viewed as an interpretation rather than a close copy of the van Eyck, that also borrows from van Eyck's now lost Madonna of Nicolas van Maelbeke.

== In literature ==
The painting is referenced in Margaret Campbell Barnes' 1946 historical novel My Lady of Cleves. As depicted in the book, about a century after it was painted the picture and its artistic merits are discussed by painter Hans Holbein and Anne of Cleves who is about to become Queen of England.

== See also ==
- List of works by Jan van Eyck

== Sources ==
- Borchert, Till-Holger. Van Eyck. London: Taschen, 2008. ISBN 978-3-8228-5687-1
- Harbison, Craig. Jan van Eyck: the play of realism. London: Reaktion Books, 1997. ISBN 0-948462-79-5
- Ridderbos, Bernhard; Van Buren, Anne; Van Veen, Henk. Early Netherlandish Paintings: Rediscovery, Reception and Research. Amsterdam: Amsterdam University Press, 2005. ISBN 0-89236-816-0
- Upton, Joel Morgan. Petrus Christus: His Place in Fifteenth-Century Flemish Painting.
- Ward, John. "Disguised Symbolism as Enactive Symbolism in Van Eyck's Paintings". Artibus et Historiae, Volume 15, No. 29, 1994
