= The Virgin and Child with a Cat =

Etching by Rembrandt

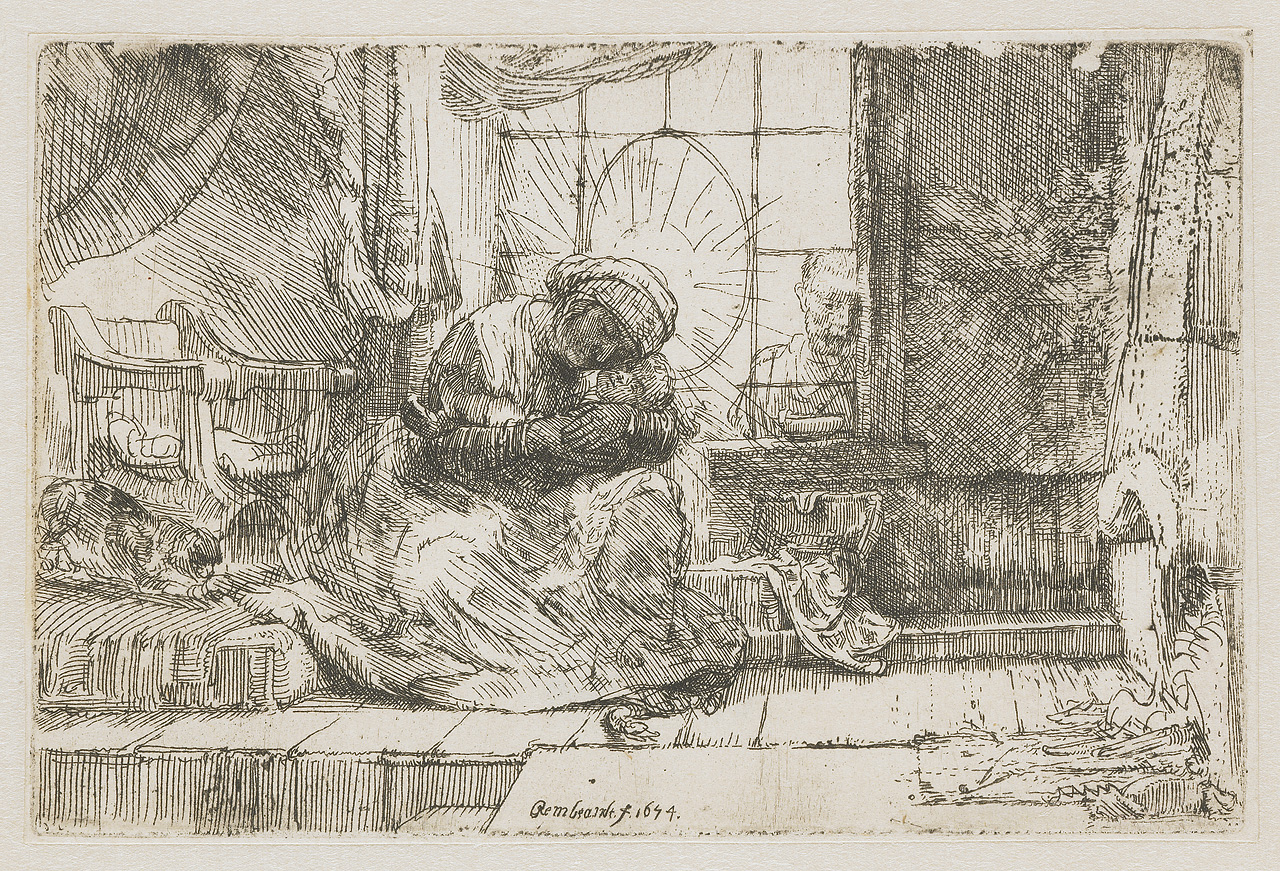
- Artist: Rembrandt
- Year: 1654
- Medium: Etching on paper
- Dimensions: 9.5 cm × 14.5 cm (3.7 in × 5.7 in)

The Virgin and Child with a Cat is an etching made in 1654 by the Dutch artist Rembrandt van Rijn (1606–1669). The Victoria and Albert Museum has in its collection one of the earliest impressions of this etching and the actual copper plate from which the image is taken.

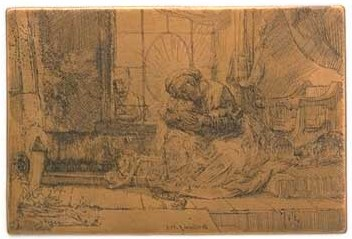
The original copper plate, in the Victoria and Albert Museum

This print shows a homely scene of maternal affection but it is also a powerful piece of Christian symbolism. While the cat on the left is playing with the Virgin's hem, a snake can be seen slithering out from under her skirt. The Virgin is treading on the snake, symbolising her role as the new Eve, who will triumph over original sin. Joseph looks in from outside the window, symbolising his closeness to, but also his separation from, the Virgin and Child. The pattern of the window's glazing creates the impression of a halo around the Virgin's head.

== See also ==
- List of drawings by Rembrandt
- List of etchings by Rembrandt

== Bibliography ==
- Jackson, Anna, ed. (2001). V&A: A Hundred Highlights. V&A Publications. ISBN 1-85177-365-7
