= Madonna of the Small Trees =

Painting by Giovanni Bellini

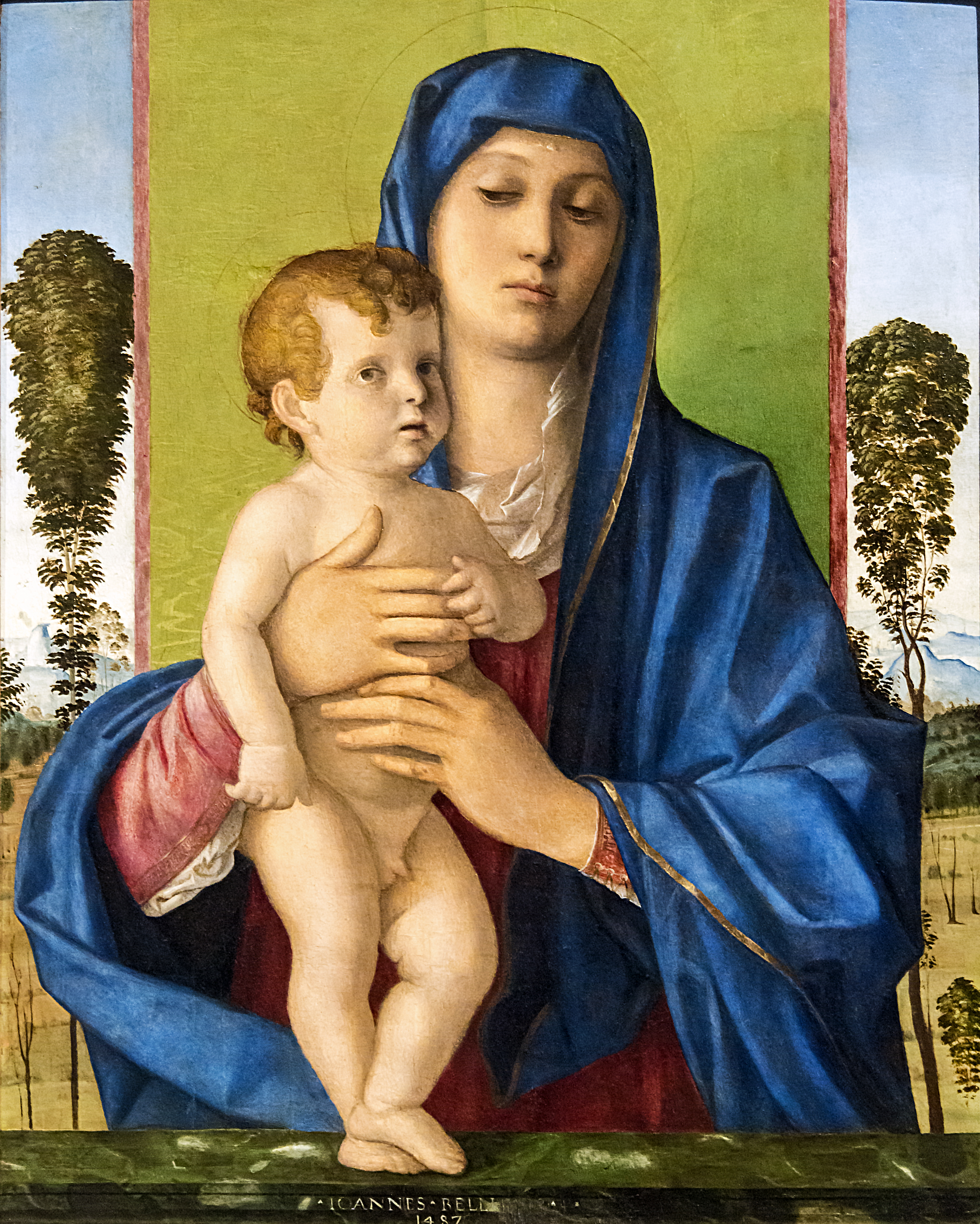
- Artist: Giovanni Bellini
- Year: 1487
- Medium: Oil on panel
- Dimensions: 74 cm × 58 cm (29 in × 23 in)
- Location: Gallerie dell'Accademia, Venice

The Madonna of the Small Trees (Italian: Madonna degli Alberetti) is an oil-on-panel painting by Italian Renaissance artist Giovanni Bellini, executed in 1487. It is housed in the Gallerie dell'Accademia in Venice.

Stylistic elements, such as the division of the background, suggest that the work was based on Bellini's Alzano Madonna in the "Accademia Carrara di Belle Arti di Bergamo".

== Description ==
The background behind the Madonna and Child includes a hanging tapestry, a typical element of contemporary sacred conversations and which also appears in the Alzano Madonna. At the sides are two portions of landscape with two slender trees, whence the traditional name of the picture.

In the lower foreground, as usual in Bellini works, is a parapet in green marble with his signature.

== See also ==
- Madonna of the Red Cherubim
- List of works by Giovanni Bellini
