= Alemanno Adimari =

Italian Catholic cardinal and archbishop

Alemanno Adimari (1362 – 17 September 1422) was an Italian Catholic cardinal and archbishop.

Born in Florence, he was a member of the noble Adimari (Family). A doctor in lay and religious jurisprudence, in 1400 he was appointed by pope Boniface VIII as bishop of Florence, but he could not take possess of that diocese. He was thus transferred to the archdiocese of Taranto in southern Italy and, in 1406, he became archbishop of Pisa, a position he held until 1411.

In that year he was created as "anti-cardinal" by antipope John XXIII, and was given the legation of France. He later moved to Spain, which at the time was faithful to antipope Benedict XIII. Pope Martin V made Adimari archpriest of St. Peter's Basilica, and sent him again to Aragon to convince Benedict XII to surrender. In 1422, while returning to Italy, he fell ill and died at Tivoli.

Adimari had Gentile da Fabriano decorate his sepulchre in the church of Santa Maria Nova (Santa Francesca Romana) in Rome. The work is now lost, but was mentioned by late Renaissance art biographer Giorgio Vasari.

== Sources ==
- La chiesa fiorentina. Florence: Curia arcivescovile di Firenze. 1970.
