= Madonna of Nicolas van Maelbeke =

Triptych attributed to Jan van Eyck

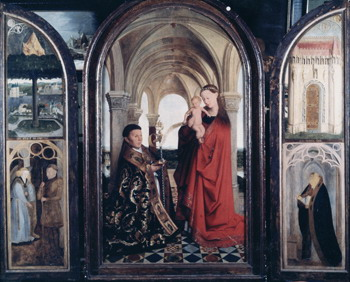
Copy after Jan van Eyck's Madonna and Child with a Donor. 172cm x 99cm. before 1757–1760.

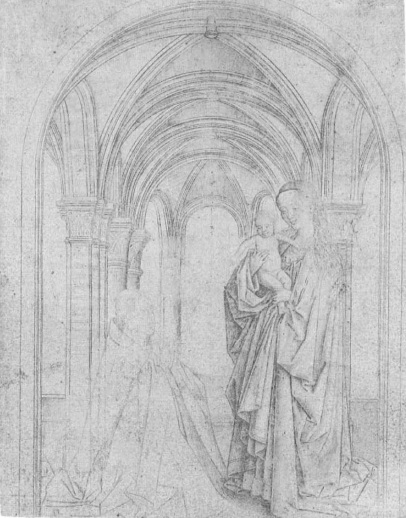
Copy after Jan van Eyck's Madonna and Child with a Donor. Silverpoint on paper, 13.4 x 10.2 cm. Unknown artist, 15th century, Germanisches Nationalmuseum, Nuremberg.

The Madonna of Nicolas van Maelbeke was a large but now lost hinged triptych attributed to Jan van Eyck, thought to have been completed late in his career, perhaps his final work. It is known today through a replica dating to 1757–1760, and several near contemporary silverpoint copies, one by Petrus Christus or his workshop c. 1445 in Vienna, and another by an unknown artist, probably a member of his workshop, which is now in the Germanisches Nationalmuseum in Nuremberg. The original was commissioned by Nicolas Maelbeke for the Saint Martin monastery in Ypres where it was installed in 1445. That the donor is present in the central panel is unusual; typically in mid-15th century triptychs donors would be in an accompanying wing.

The drawings are perfunctory copies of the type routinely carried out by workshop assistants, who were presumably recording the design for later full oil panels.

In the 18th century copy, the virgin stands in a cathedral with a vaulted ceiling dressed in a scarlet mantle. She holds the Christ Child in her arms as the donor Nicolas Maelbeke kneels before her. He wears a richly embroidered green cope and holds a book of hours in his right hand and a scepter in his left. The wing panels contain scenes related to the Immaculate Conception, including representations of the burning bush, Gideon, Ezekiel and Aaron's rod. When closed, the 18th century copy's exterior wings show a grisaille depiction of the vision of Ara Coeli.

== Sources ==
- Ainsworth, Maryan. Petrus Christus: Renaissance Master of Bruges. New York: Metropolitan Museum of Art, 1994. ISBN 0-8109-6482-1.
- Van Puyvelde, Leo. "Jan van Eyck's Last Work". The Burlington Magazine for Connoisseurs, Volume 56, No. 322, January 1930.
