= Madonna of the Holy Trinity Church =

Painting in České Budějovice, Czechia

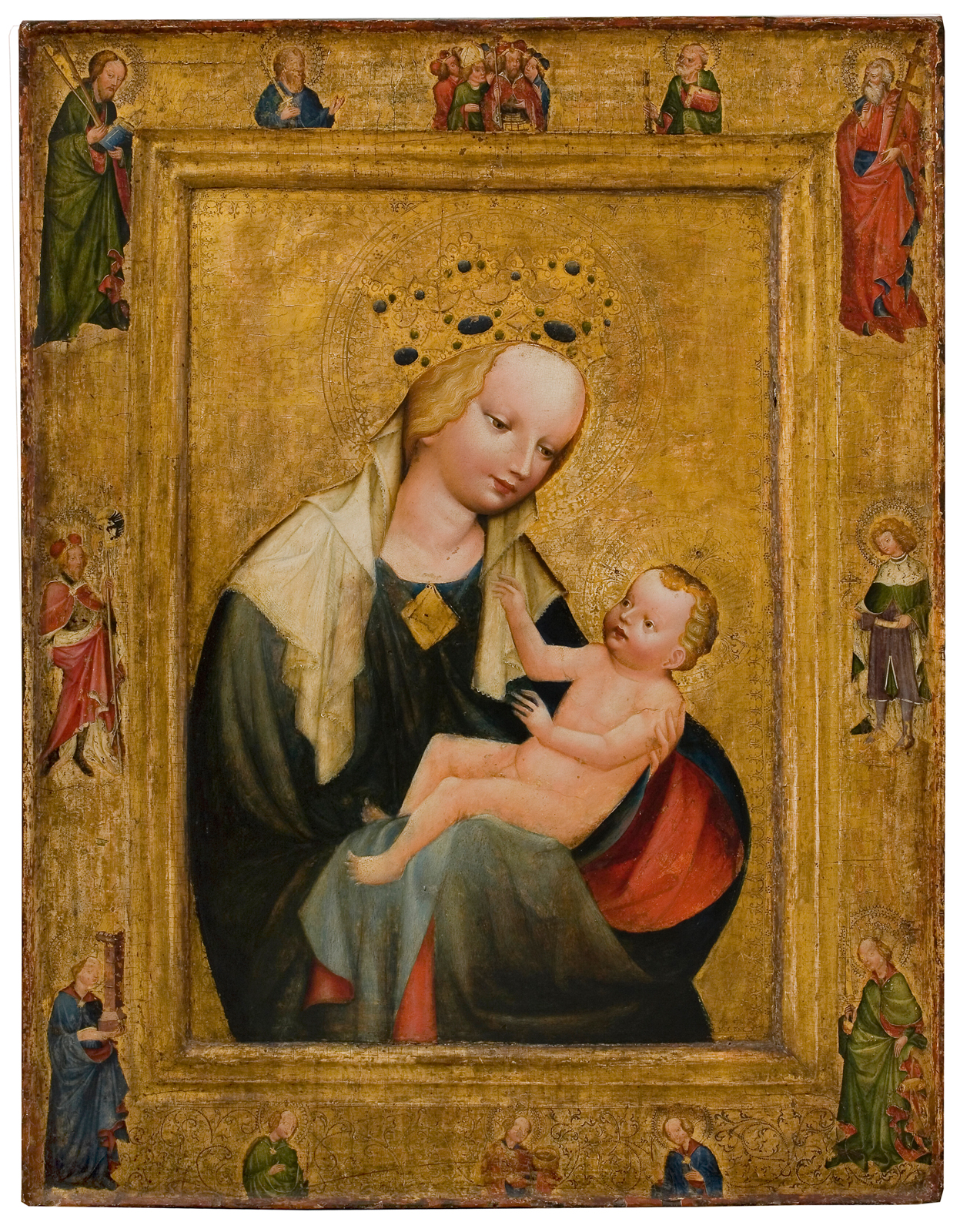
- Year: c. 1410
- Medium: Tempera with gilding on a chalk base
- Movement: Gothic
- Subject: Virgin Mary and infant Jesus
- Location: Aleš South Bohemian Gallery in Hluboká nad Vltavou

The painting of the Madonna of the Holy Trinity Church (c. 1410) is the oldest surviving panel painting in České Budějovice and is one of the oldest known Gothic pictures with a painted frame. It is on display at the permanent collection of Aleš South Bohemian Gallery in Hluboká nad Vltavou.

== History ==
This work comes from a Prague painting workshop. The place it was originally located is not known, but it probably reached South Bohemia later on, during the Hussite Wars. The iconography of the painted frame indicates that it could have been intended for an altar consecrated to the cult of ‘St Peter of the Martyr Brothers’ and the Bohemian patron saints, for example in the church of St Wenceslaus in Stará Boleslav. In 1796 it was bought from Veronika Fischerová by the Český Krumlov dyer Jakub Pechtl, who in 1811 donated it to the hospital Church of the Holy Trinity in České Budějovice. At the end of the 19th century the picture was, in exchange for a copy of it, donated to the Town Museum in České Budějovice. In 1953 it was transferred to the Aleš South Bohemian Gallery in Hluboká nad Vltavou.

== Description and classification ==
It is a tempera painting with gilding on a chalk base. The centre of the picture is a panel of spruce wood measuring 69 x 48 cm stretched with canvas. On the back of the panel there is painting imitating precious stone. The painted frame made of lime wood measures 96 x 75.5 x 4.5 cm. The picture was inexpertly restored in the late 19th century (B. Čurn). Further restoration was carried out by A. Bělohoubek (workshop of the Society of Patriotic Friends of Art, Prague) and by Bohuslav Slánský (1957, Prague).

=== The picture of the Madonna ===
Mary, portrayed as the crowned queen of heaven, is dressed in a blue-green cloak with a red inner lining. Traces left by the attachment of a reliquary remain on her chest where the cloak is clasped together. Her right arm, hidden by the cloak, supports the naked Infant Jesus's body. With her left hand, she holds him by the shoulder. On her head she wears a white veil with a decorated hem. Her crown with painted jewels is part of the gilded background that is decorated with punched patterns.

The half-length figure of the crowned Virgin Mary and Infant Jesus is a faithful copy of an older picture of a loving Madonna, the Madonna of Roudnice (1385-1390), however it already shows signs of the established International Gothic. In contrast to its model, it lacks deeper chiaroscuro modelling and the faces appear flatter. Precious lapis lazuli, which has retained its bright ultramarine colour, was used as the pigment for the Roudnice Madonna’s cloak. In later copies azurite was used instead of lapis lazuli, however azurite turns into malachite as it ages and thus turns a blue-green shade.

=== The painted frame ===
On the left vertical batten of the frame there appear, from the top, the figures of James the Great, St Wenceslaus and St Barbara. On the right batten, from the top, there appear St Phillip, St Vitus and St Catherine. On the top batten there are, from the left, the half-length figures of St Paul, a group of Bohemian saints (the Five Brothers?) with St Wenceslaus and St Adalbert at the front and St Peter to the right of them. On the bottom batten there are, from the left, the half-length figures of St Ursula, St Dorothea and St Apollonia.

In the foundation layer, the arrangement of the contours and lines is engraved or drawn in grey. The drapery is executed in radiant light blue, red, olive green and blue-green pigments. The underpainting of the shadows in the white veils and flesh tones is brown. The background is gilded and decorated with punched patterns and leafwork ornament (the bottom batten).

In the figures of the Bohemian patron saints and the quality of the painting, art historians see a connection with the frame of the St Vitus Veil of Veronica (after 1400). They do not, however, assume it was made in the same workshop. What they have in common is the typology of the figures (St Wenceslaus, St Vitus) and the vertical zigzagging folds of the pointed drapery that is highlighted along its hems with a white line. According to Matouš, the portrayal of the figures on the frame connects the conservative (Byzantine-influenced) style of the late 14th century with influence of the work of the Master of the Třeboň Altarpiece in a mannerist form typical of the period around 1410.

=== Details of frame ===
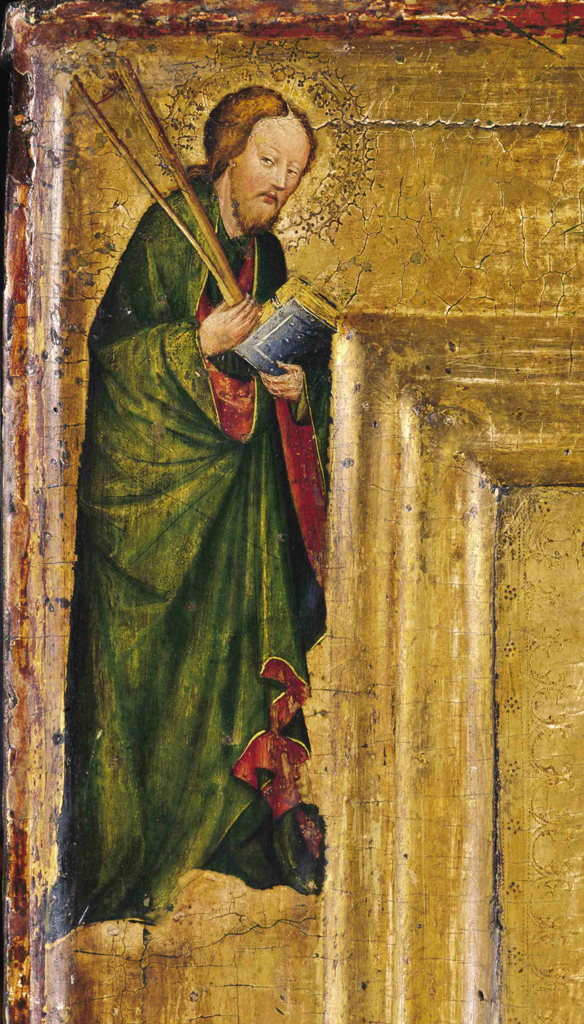
James the Great

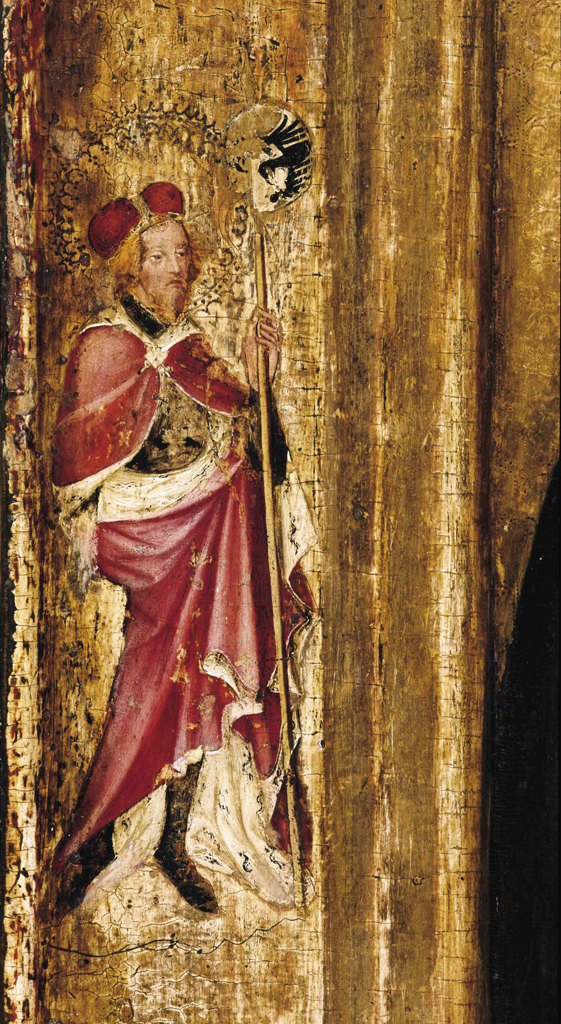
St Wenceslaus

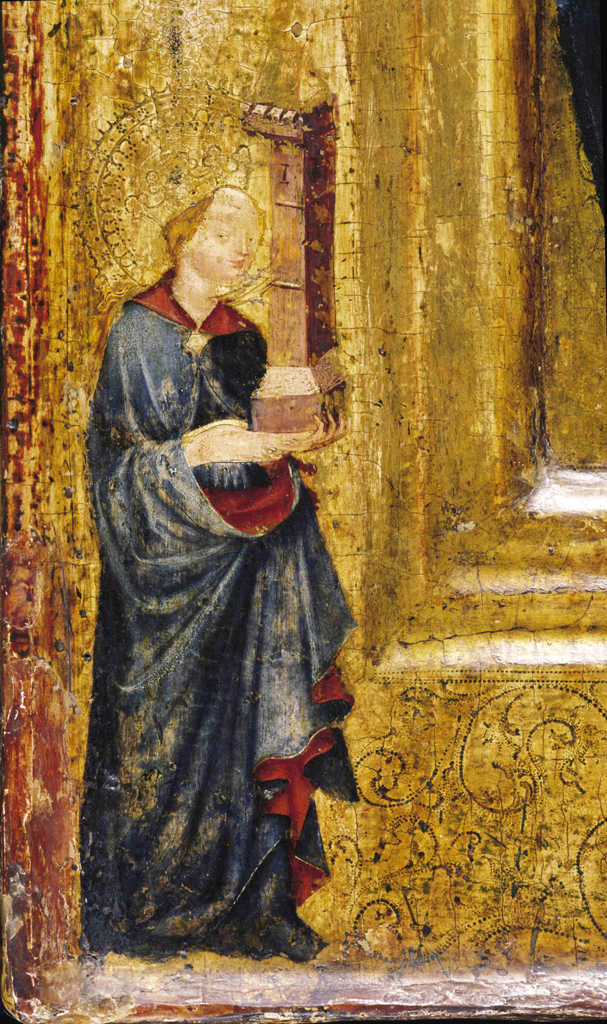
St Barbara

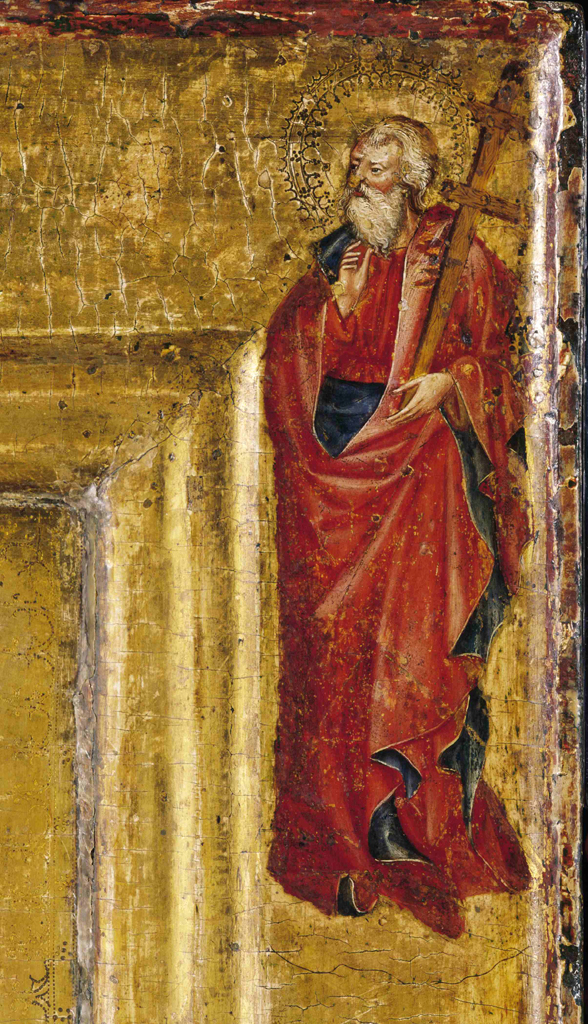
St Phillip

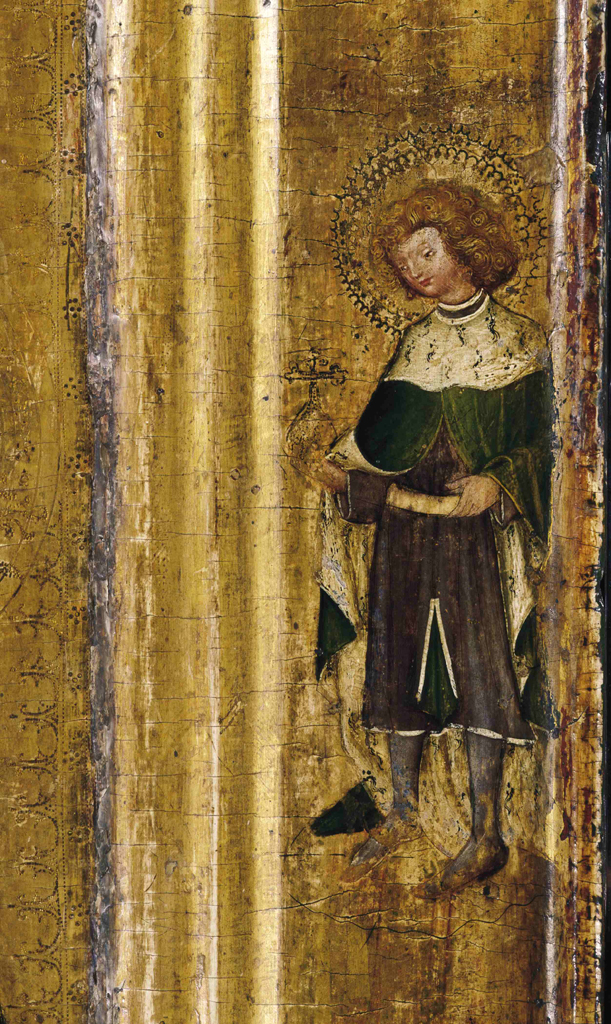
St Vitus

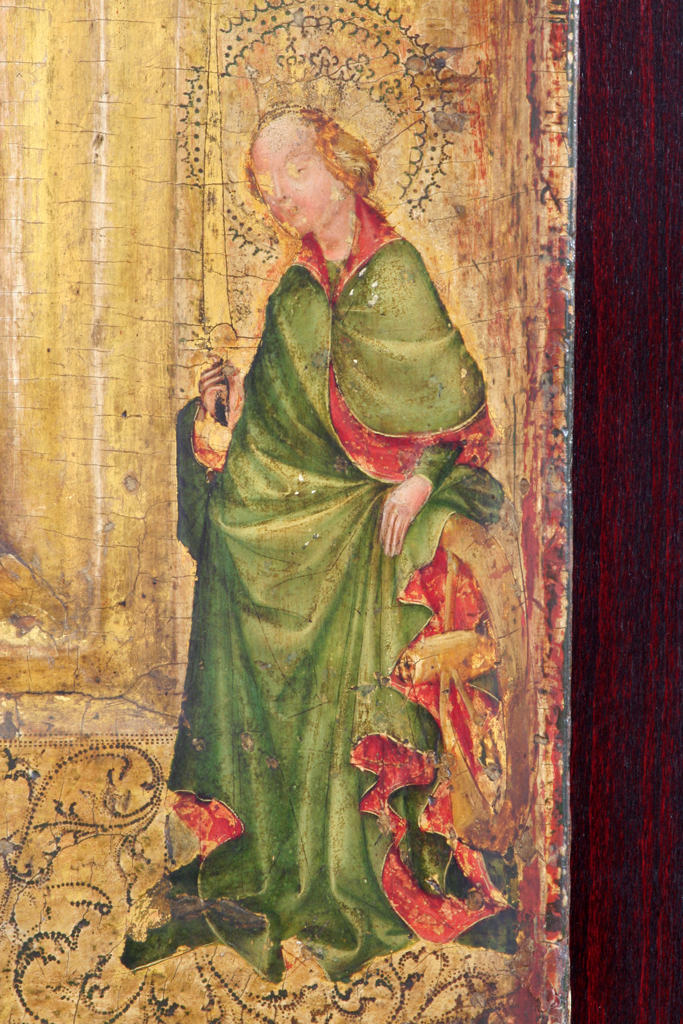
St Catherine

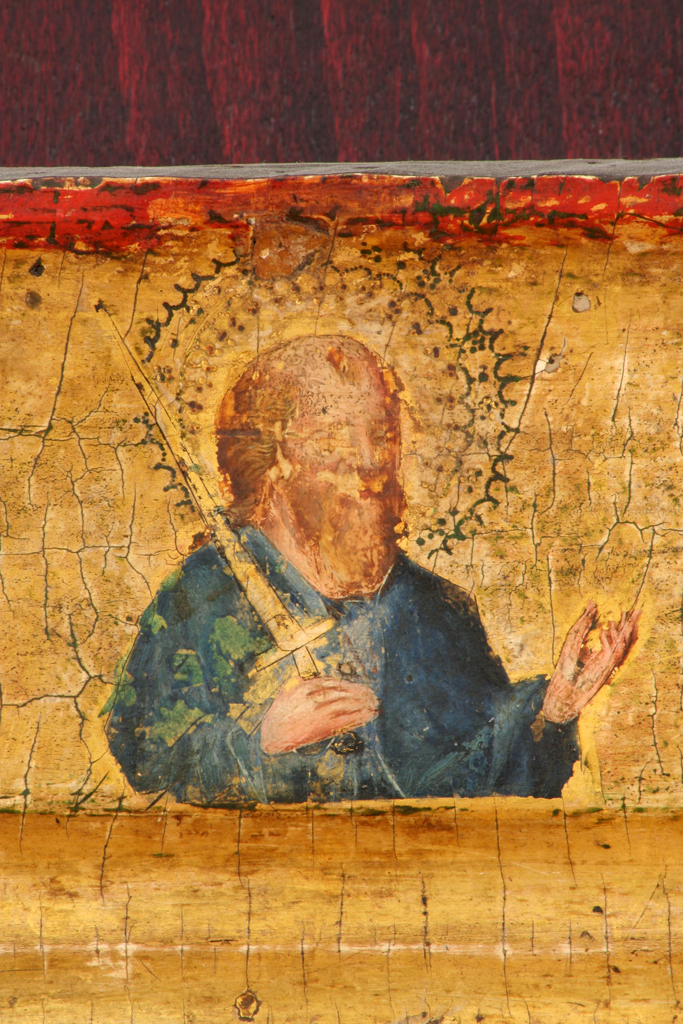
St Paul

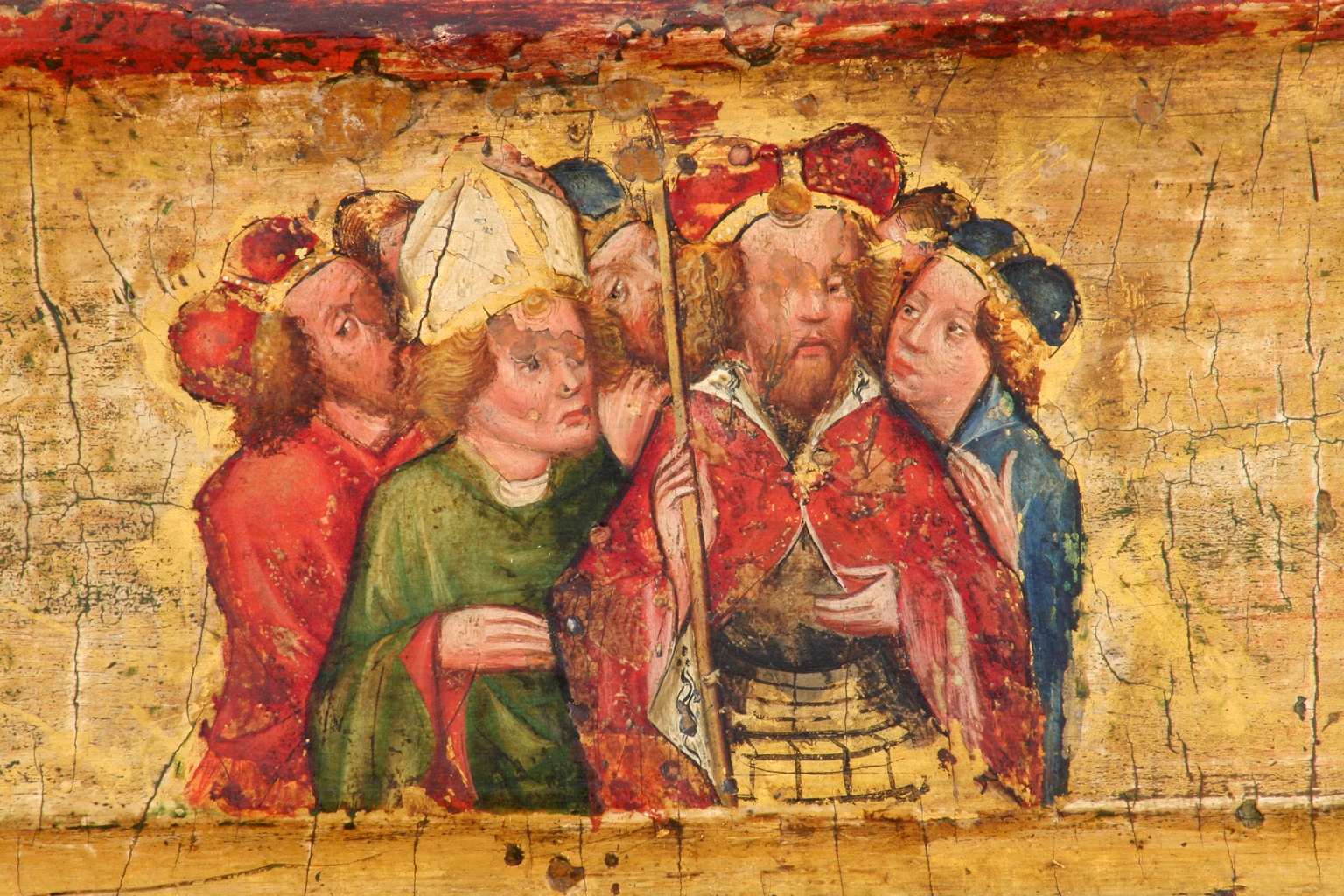
Bohemian saints with St Wenceslaus and St Adalbert at the front

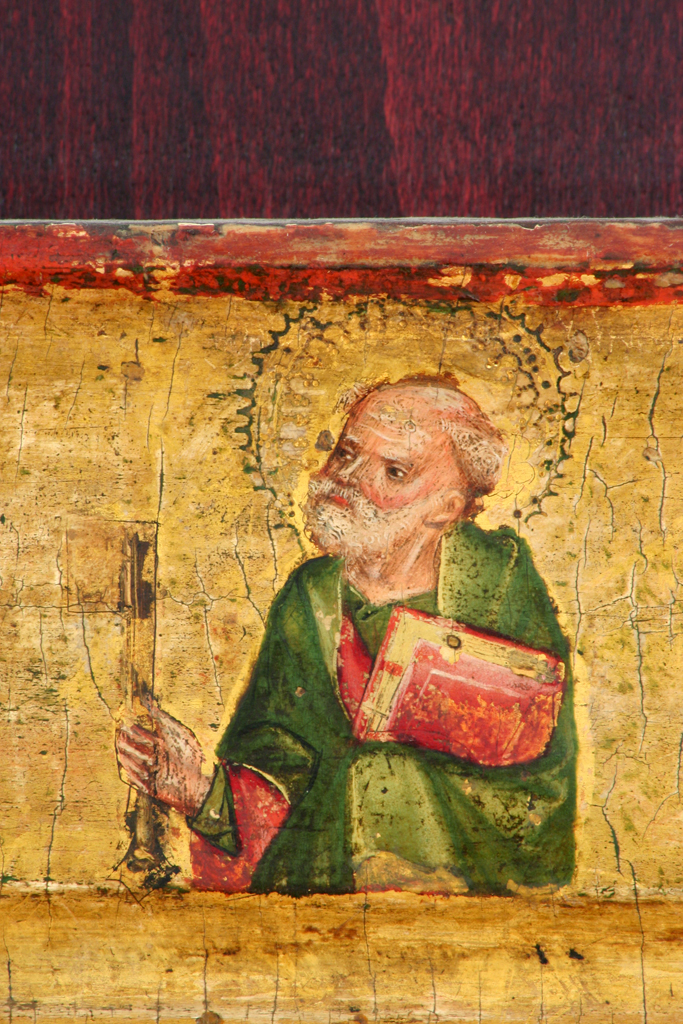
St Peter

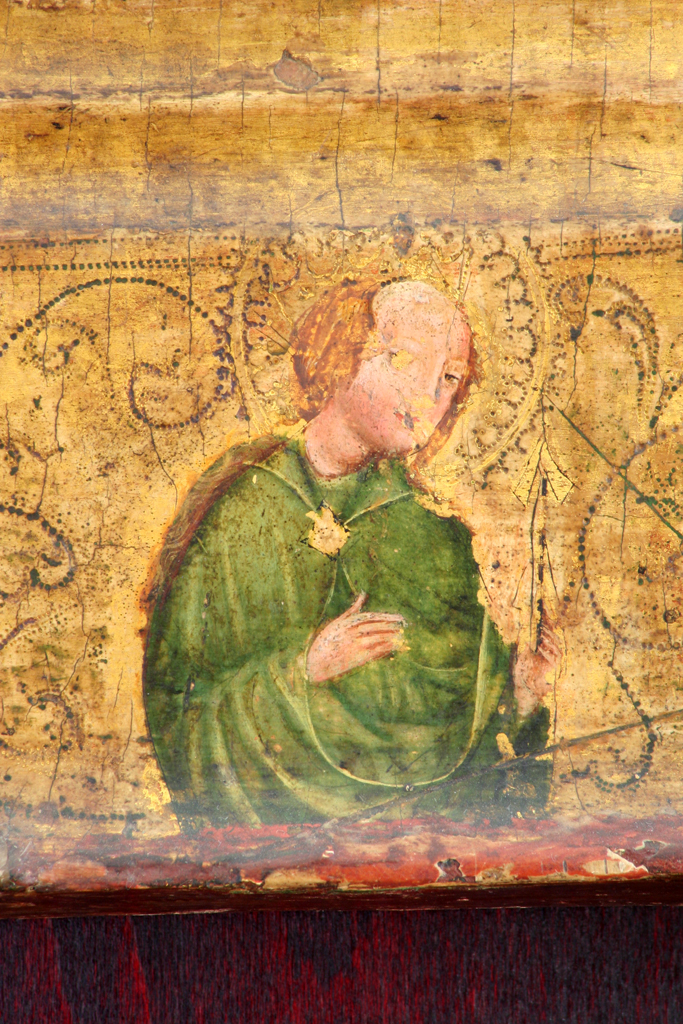
St Ursula

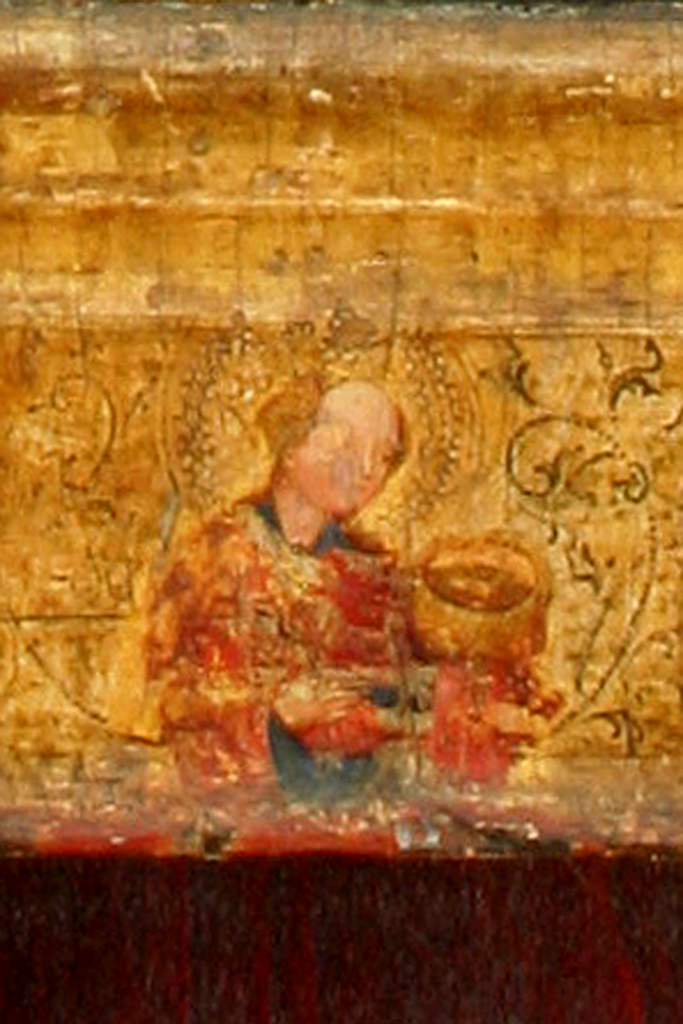
St Dorothea

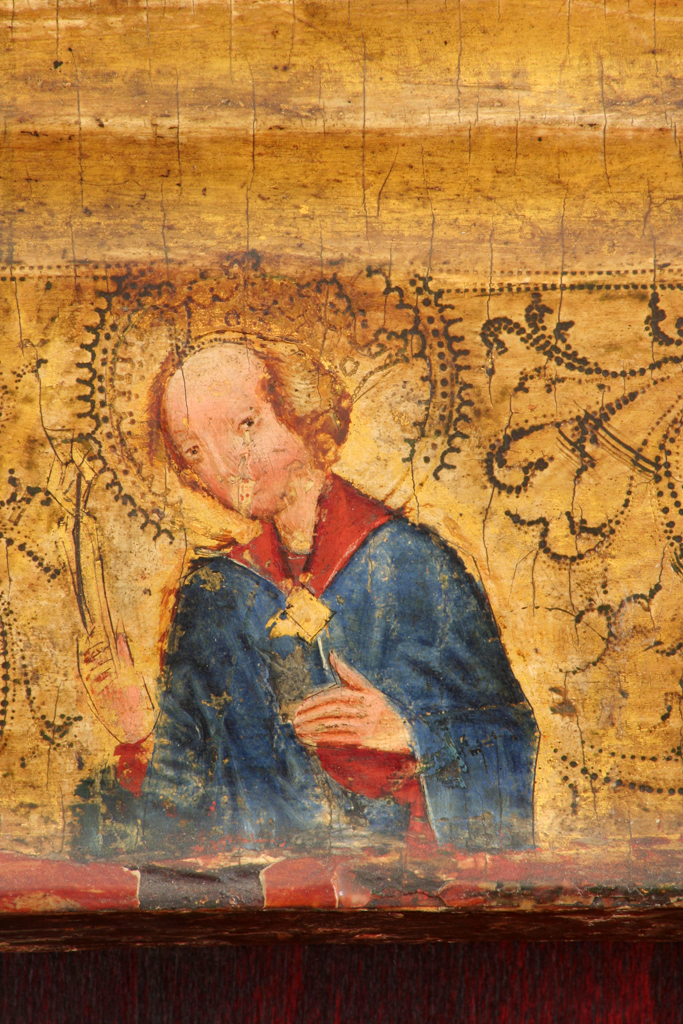
St Apollonia

== Related works ==
- Madonna of Roudnice (1385-1390
- The St Vitus Veil of Veronica (after 1400)
- The Wrocław Madonna (after 1420)
- Madonna of Vyšší Brod (after 1420)
- Madonnas with painted frames: Madonna of Svojšín (1410), Assumpta from Deštná (1450-1460), Madonna of the Jindřichův Hradec (1450-1460)

== Sources ==
- Inv. no. 0–2, AJG
- Hynek Látal a kol., Meziprůzkumy. Sbírka AJG 1300–2016, č. 13 AJG 2016, ISBN 978-80-87799-52-9
- Roman Lavička, Gothic Art, Aleš South Bohemian Gallery 2008, s. 20–23, ISBN 978-80-86952-57-4
- Hynek Rulíšek, Gotické umění jižních Čech, Průvodce, sv. 3, Alšova jihočeská galerie v Hluboké nad Vltavou 1989, s. 22–25, ISBN 80-900057-6-4
- Hynek Rulíšek, Gotické umění v jižních Čechách, Národní galerie v Praze 1989, s. 41-43 ISBN 80-7035-013-X
- Milena Štefanová, Figurálně zdobené rámy českých gotických obrazů, Umění XXXIII 1985
- Jaroslav Pešina, Desková malba, in: České umění gotické 1350–1420, Academia Praha 1970
- Věra Frömlová, Restaurace a průzkum malby madony vyšebrodské, Umění XII, 1964
- Vladimír Denkstein, František Matouš, Jihočeská gotika, Praha 1953
- Antonín Matějček, Česká malba gotická, str. 123–124, Melantrich Praha 1950
