= Crucified Christ (Třeboň) =

14th-century Bohemian sculpture

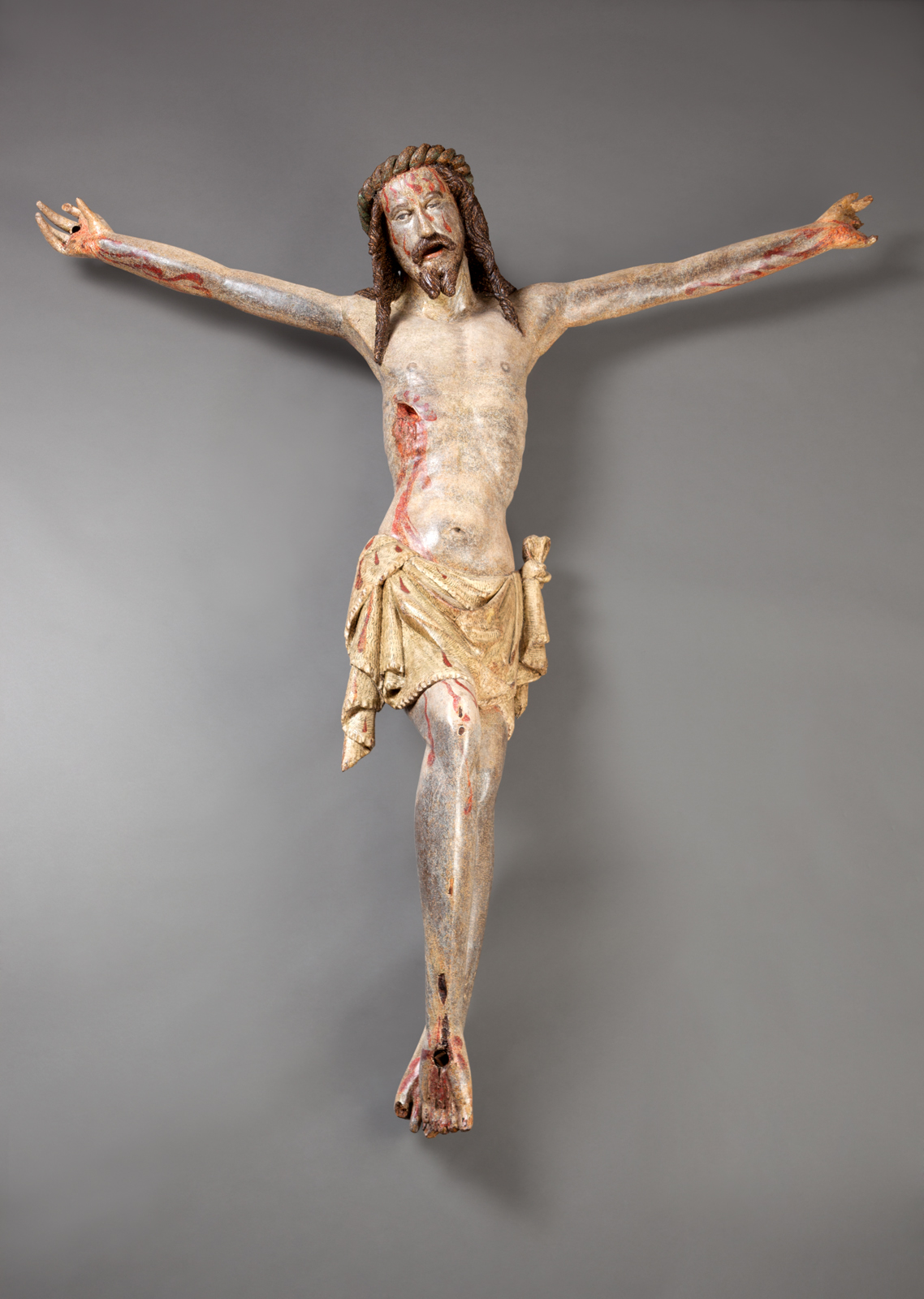
Crucified Christ from Třeboň, Aleš South Bohemian Gallery in Hluboká nad Vltavou

The Crucified Christ (around 1380) from the Augustinian monastery church of Saint Giles in Třeboň is one of the most important sculptural monuments from the end of the reign of Charles IV. It was part of a set of sculptures attributed to the Prague workshop of the Master of the Madonna of Žebrák. The statue of the Crucified Christ is on display in the permanent exhibition of the Aleš South Bohemian Gallery in Hluboká nad Vltavou.

== History ==
The Crucifix was originally placed probably on the triumphal arch between the main double nave and the chancel of the Church of St. Jiljí (Saint Giles) in Třeboň, together with the statues of St John the Evangelist (now in the National Gallery Prague) and the Virgin Mary (not preserved). Before 1947 the statue was loaned to the Regional Museum of Local History in České Budějovice and from there in 1953 it was transferred to the Aleš South Bohemian Gallery in Hluboká nad Vltavou.

== Description and classification ==
Fully plastic sculpture made of spruce wood, with preserved original polychromy, height 161 cm. The right leg bears traces of charring and it is therefore likely that for some time the statue was installed on the altar or separately in the church space within reach of the candles. Restored by Bohuslav Slánský (1948, 1958).

The figure of Christ is characterized by formal refinement and a fully sculptural design that respects the body volume and anatomical details. The head of Christ differs from the expressive mystical crucifixes of the first half of the 14th century in the calm expression of quiet pain and the lyricism of the idealised face. The beard is parted in the middle and, like the long curled strands of hair and the crown of thorns, ornamentally stylized. The scalloped loincloth is folded at the right side and knotted at the left. The folds of the drapery of the Christ and St. John statues indicate the sculptor's familiarity with the paintings of the Master of the Třeboň Altarpiece. They represent one of the precursors, or rather the carving counterpart, of the marlstone statues of the beautiful style.

The statue has preserved its original polychromy. Christ's wound on the side from which long strands of blood flow out to the drapery and right leg is widely open and accentuated by the bloodstains that surround it. Drops of blood also run down onto Christ's forehead and face under the crown of thorns. The downward gaze of the open eyes suggests that Christ has not died but is speaking to the faithful. The whole concept of the statue is a representation of the sacrifice of Jesus, highlighting its Eucharistic meaning and pointing to the sacrifice of the mass and the sacrament of the altar.

=== Details ===
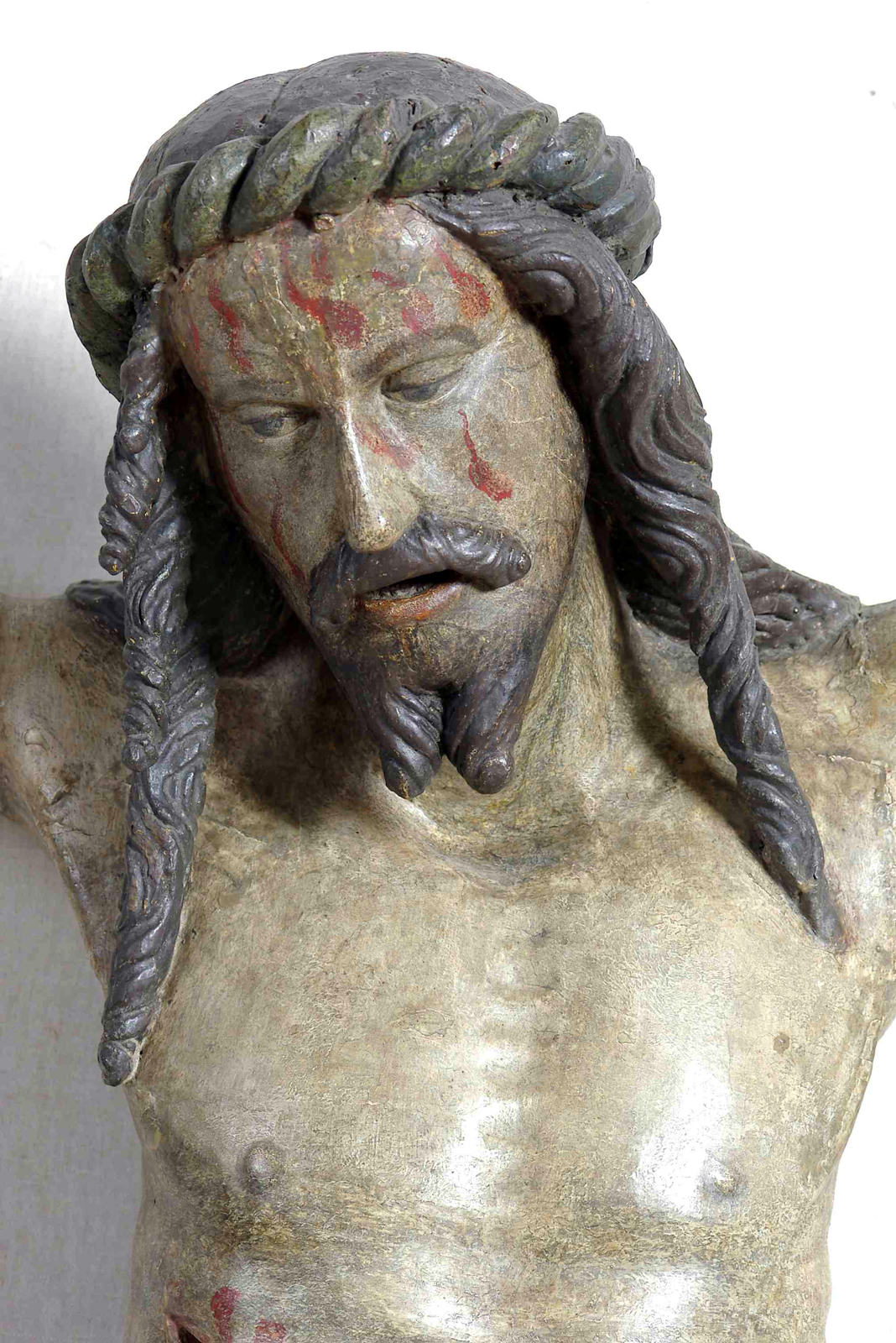

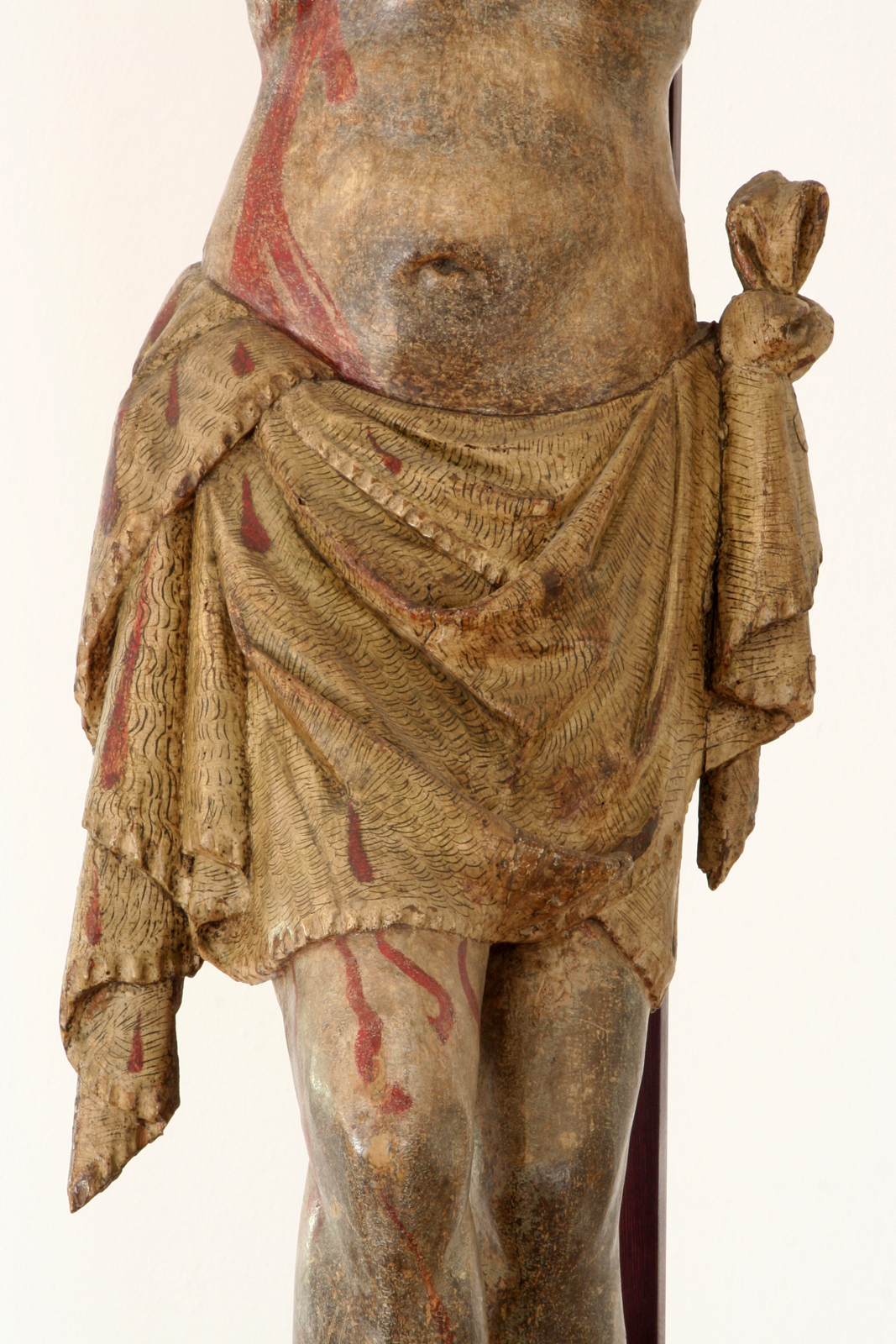

=== Related works ===
- St. John the Evangelist (c. 1380), National Gallery Prague
- Madonna of Žebrák (c. 1380), National Gallery Prague
- Madonna from the Church of Our Lady of the Snows in Olomouc (c. 1380), Olomouc Museum of Art
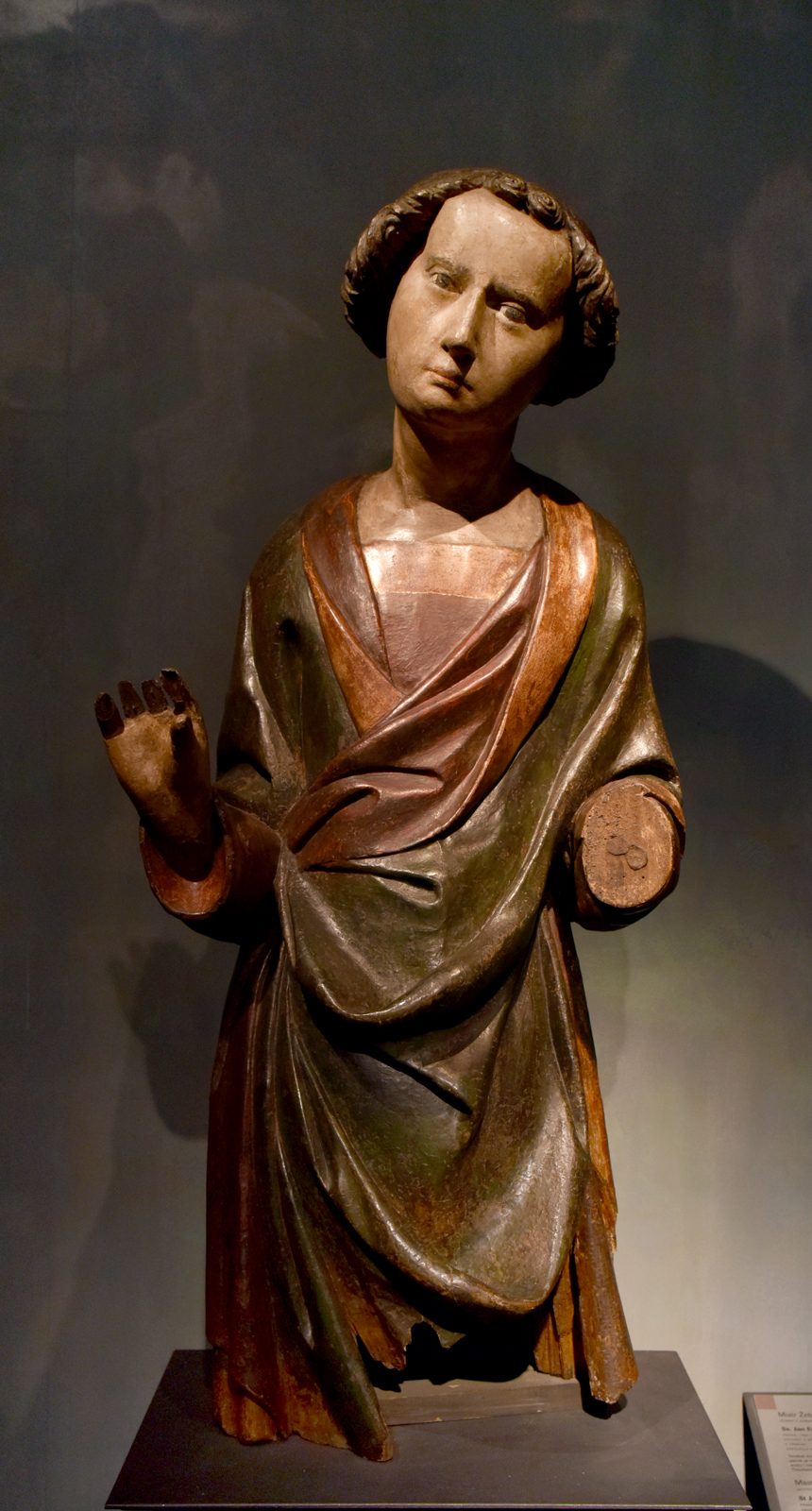
St John the Evangelist (c. 1380) from Třeboň, Master of the Madonna of Žebrák (1380–1390), National Gallery Prague

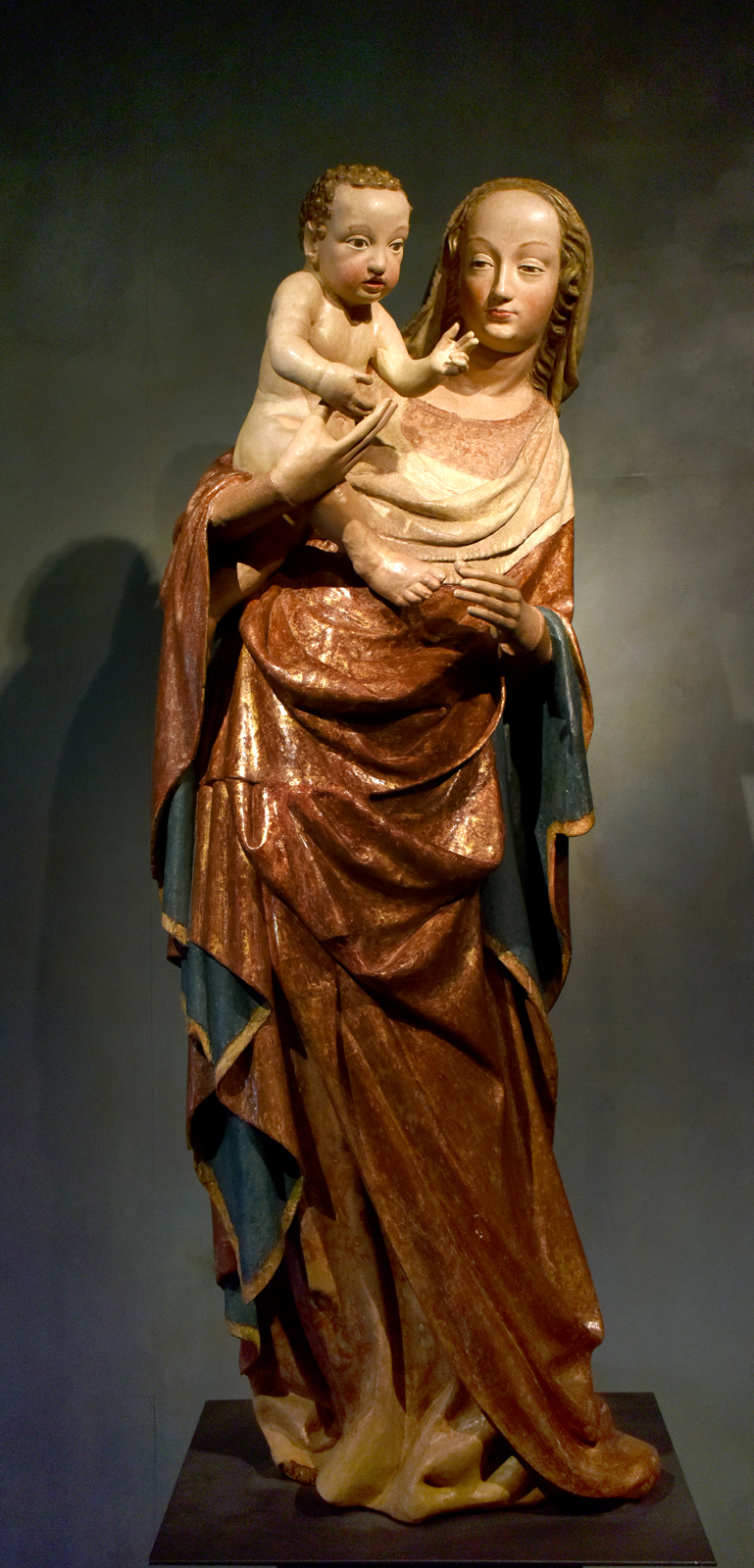
Madonna of Žebrák (around 1380), National Gallery Prague

== Sources ==
- Registration sheet Inv. no. P-7, Aleš South Bohemian Gallery in Hluboká nad Vltavou
- Hynek Látal, Petra Lexová, Martin Vaněk, Meziprůzkumy, AJG Collection 1300–2016, no. 4, AJG Hluboká nad Vltavou 2016, ISBN 978-80-87799-52-9
- Fajt Jiří, Chlumská Štěpánka, Bohemia and Central Europe 1200–1550, National Gallery in Prague 2014, ISBN 978-80-7035-569-5
- Roman Lavička, Gothic Art, Aleš South Bohemian Gallery 2008, ISBN 978-80-86952-57-4
- Hynek Rulíšek, Gothic Art of South Bohemia, Guide, vol. 3, Alš South Bohemia Gallery in Hluboká nad Vltavou 1989, ISBN 80-900057-6-4
- Hynek Rulíšek, Gothic Art in South Bohemia, National Gallery in Prague 1989, ISBN 80-7035-013-X
