= Adoration of Our Lord from Hluboká =

14th-century painting

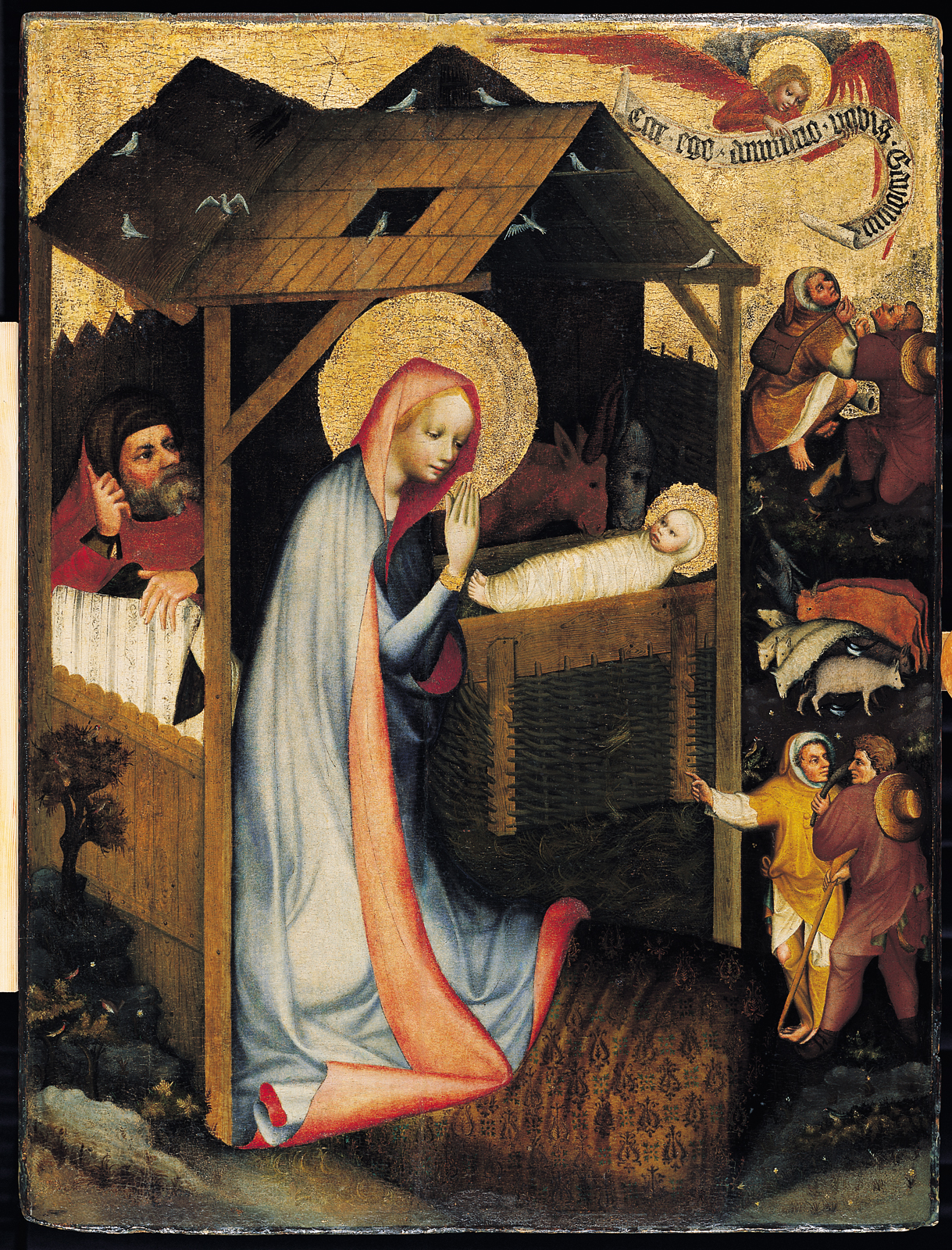
Adoration of Our Lord from Hluboká, Aleš South Bohemian Gallery, Hluboká nad Vltavou

The Adoration of Our Lord from Hluboká is a panel painting dating from the period around 1380, ascribed to the Master of the Třeboň Altarpiece or his workshop. It is on display in the permanent collection of the Aleš South Bohemian Gallery in Hluboká nad Vltavou as a loan from National Heritage Institute in České Budějovice.

== History ==
The place where it was originally located is not known. In the 19th century the painting was the property of Princess Eleonore von Schwarzenberg at Hluboká nad Vltavou, in modern day Czech Republic. It was then transferred from state-owned Hluboká Castle to the ownership of the National Heritage Institute in České Budějovice. The picture was heavily overpainted by a Renaissance artist in 1516. During restoration undertook in 1930 (J. Bělohoubek), only the crudest overpainting was removed. Antonín Matějček, who saw the picture before 1950, thus observed that it was in a poor state and was impossible to evaluate. The present-day appearance of the picture is the result of restoration undertaken between 1968 and 1969 (National Gallery Prague, V. Frömlová).

== Description and classification ==
The picture is painted in tempera on a panel of spruce wood stretched with canvas. The panel is composed of seven boards between 14 and 17 cm wide joined with pegs. The overall size of the picture is 129 x 98 cm.

Considered an early work by the Master of the Třeboň Altarpiece, the painting was probably part of a winged altarpiece. Its size corresponds to the Resurrection from the Chapel of St Barbara near Třeboň that also comes from the workshop of the Master of the Třeboň Altarpiece. At some point in the past it was clearly exposed to severe heat that caused numerous small blisters in the damaged paint right down to the foundation layer. Thanks to successive overpainting, however, the flesh tones have remained very well preserved. The picture is identical with the Třeboň Altarpiece in terms of the construction of its frame, the foundation layer and the painting technique - specifically the red earth underdrawing and the delicate engraved drawing in the drapery; the light flesh tones on a foundation of white paint without coloured underpainting; the radiant lazure painting and the exceptional feeling for painting; the masterful sienna painting in the semi-shades; the gilding on black poliment and the same character of the halos.

The central figure of the Virgin Mary leaning over the Infant Jesus in his cradle is accompanied on the left by the kneeling and gesticulating Joseph. The Virgin Mary is kneeling on a brocade cushion in a simple wooden hut. She is dressed in a blue cloak with a red inner lining that is folded back on her head and covers her hair. Its drapery is modelled in long vertical folds that suppress the physical mass of the elongated figure. It was only restoration undertaking in the 1960s that revealed the perfection of the painting. According to Pešina, the delicate charm of Mary's feminine face, the soft modelling of its shape that almost melts into light, the colour harmony and the radiance of the lazure painting surpasses the quality of the Třeboň Altarpiece. The typology of the faces – the female face with its delicate nose and chin, Joseph's whiskery face, just like the character of the rocky landscape with its stunted trees, brightly coloured birds and details observed from nature, corresponds to other works by the Master of the Třeboň Altarpiece.

The hut is depicted from three different angles in an imperfect perspective that, even so, evokes the impression of spatial depth. In the landscape, which still recalls the work of the Master of the Třeboň Altarpiece, there are two pairs of shepherds on the right in different spatial planes that depict events of the past: the Annunciation and journeying to the stable in Bethlehem. In the top right-hand corner, we see the angel of the Annunciation with a ribbon bearing the inscription 'Ecce ego annun[t]io vobis Gaudium'. The grazing animals on the right symbolise the Old (the goat) and New Testament (the sheep). They are accompanied by a couple of pigs and cows. The heads of a donkey and an ox appear in the stable behind the crib. The main figures (Mary and Joseph) are portrayed in a hieratical perspective as proportionally larger.

The infant, who is entirely wrapped in swaddling reminiscent of a shroud and is lying in the wooden crib in the shape of a coffin, refers to Jesus's future martyrdom. The image represents a new iconographical type that developed out of the earlier scene of Nativity of Jesus through the influence of mystical trends in the church at that time (the Vision of St Bridget of Sweden, 1380). According to this interpretation, Mary recognised Jesus's divinity after he was born and began worshipping him spontaneously. It is, in this case, a devotional image designed to encourage piety among the faithful.

=== Details ===
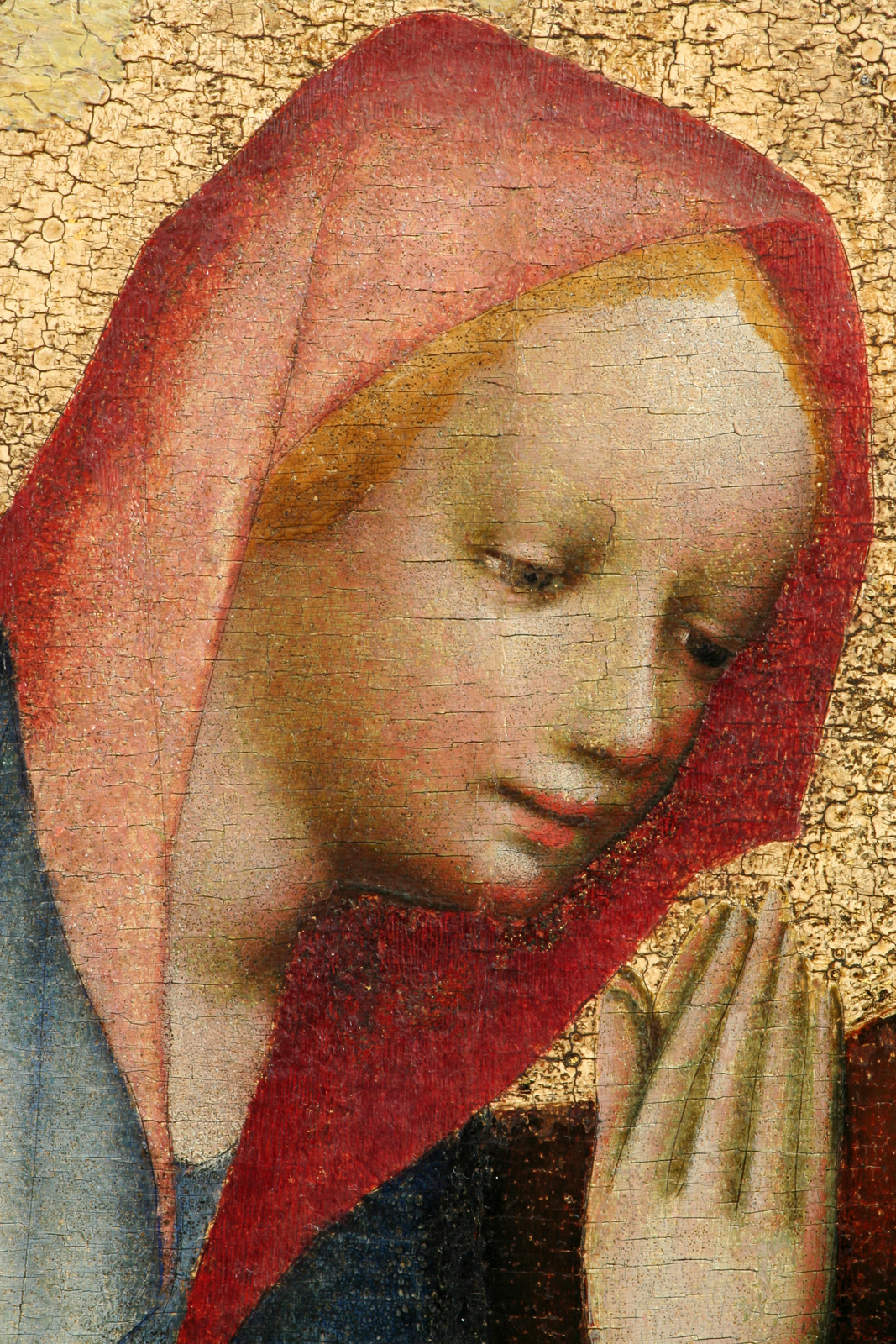

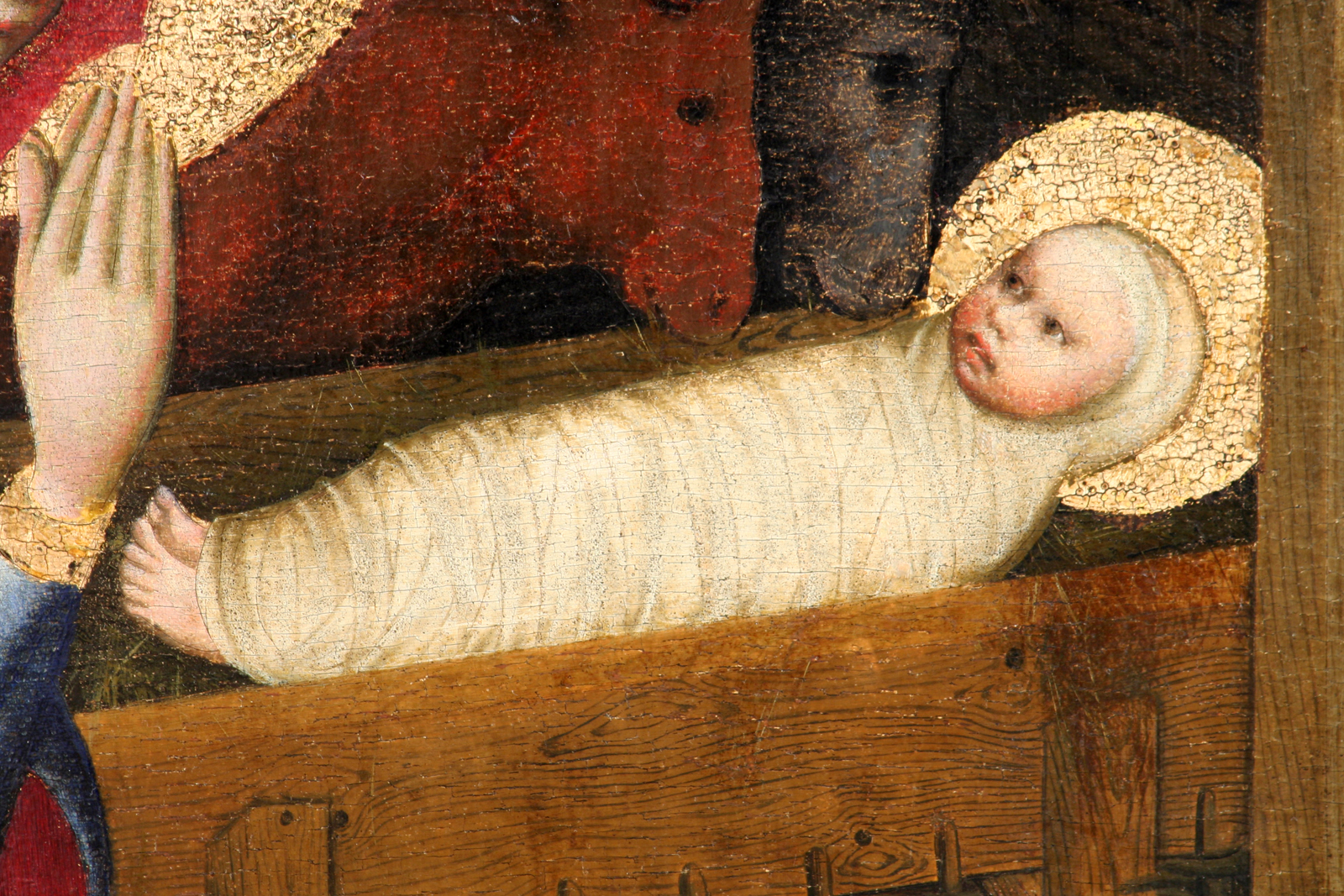

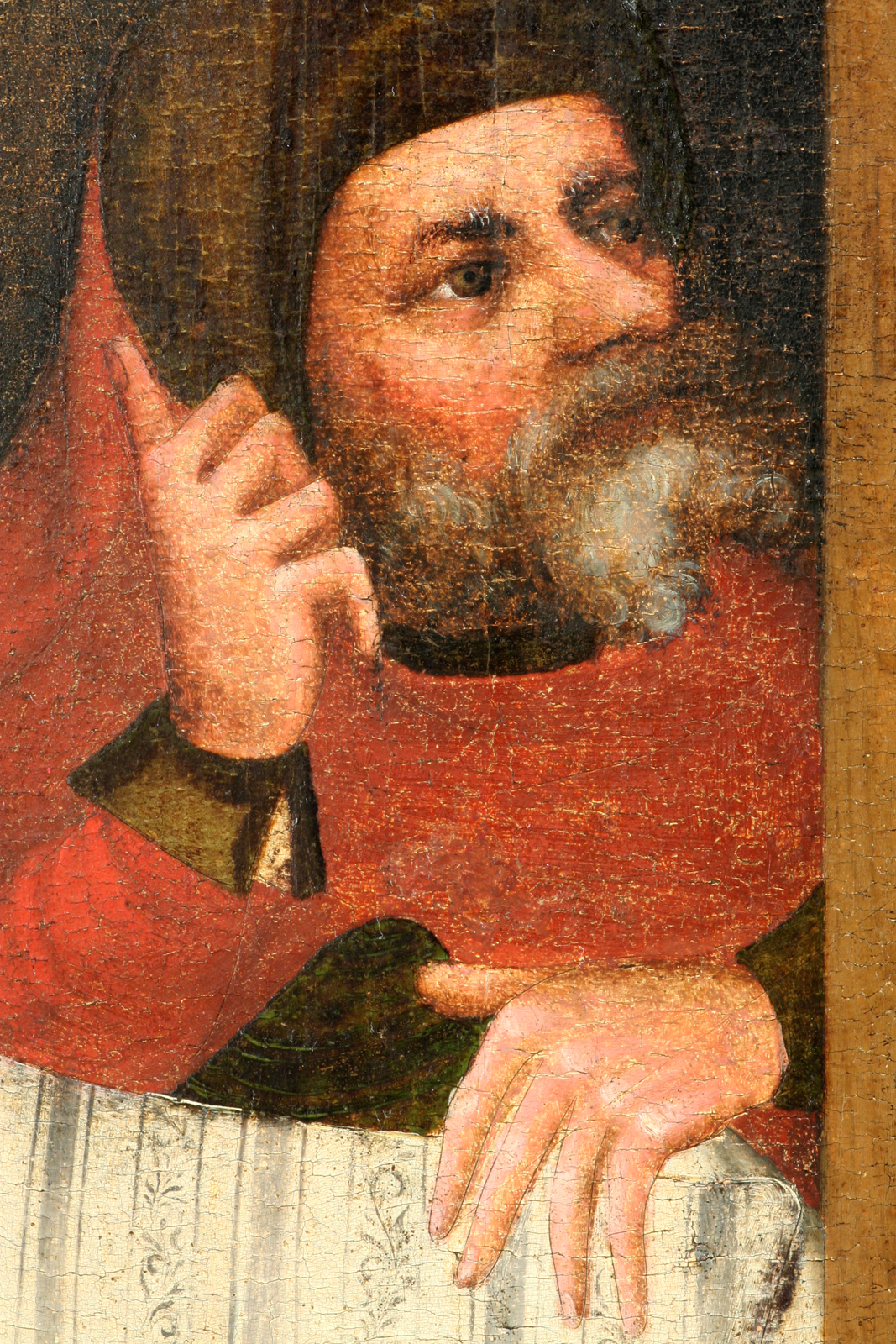

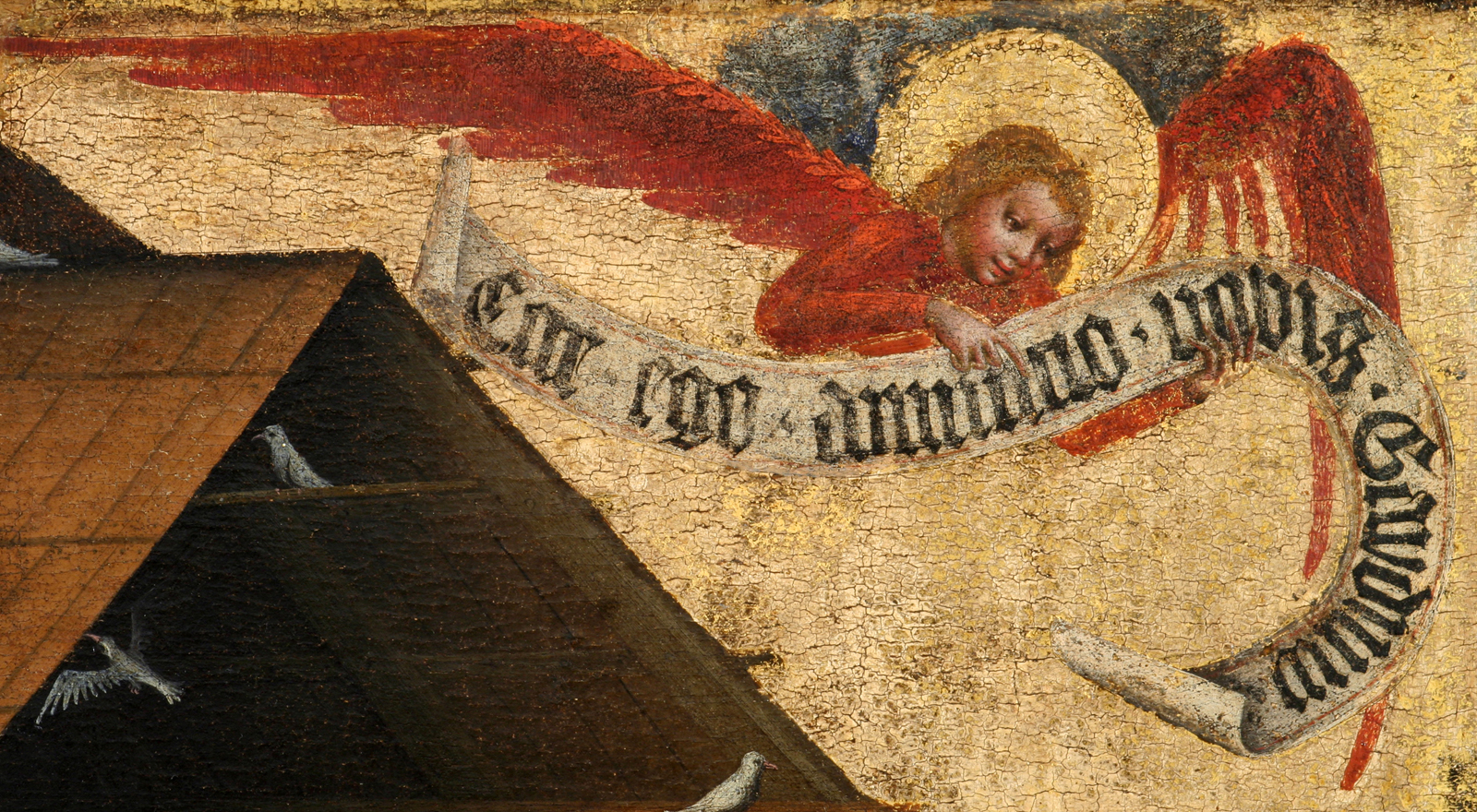

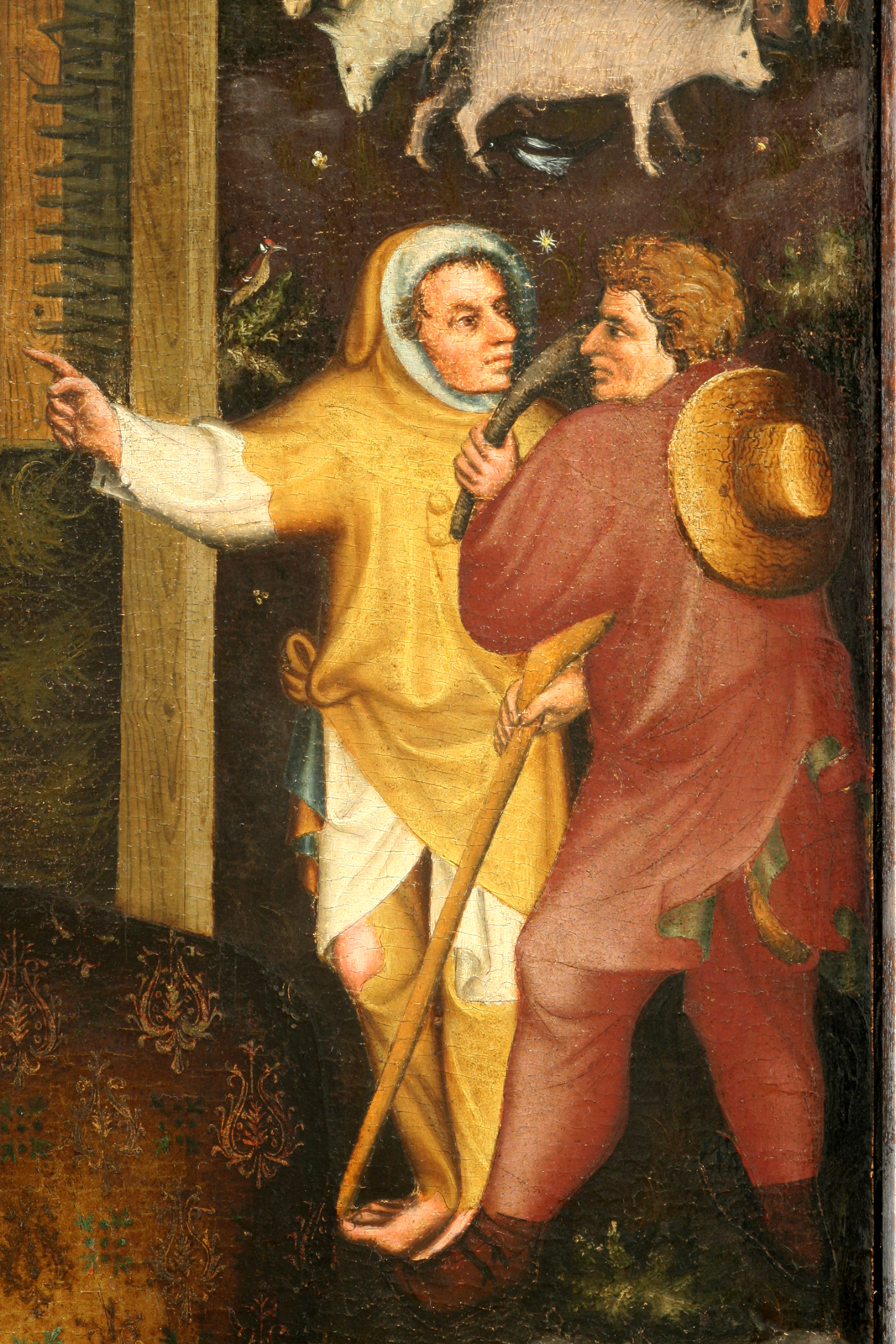

== Sources ==
- AJG, inv. no. DO-834
- Hynek Látal a kol., Meziprůzkumy. Sbírka AJG 1300–2016, no. 7, AJG 2016, ISBN 978-80-87799-52-9
- Roman Lavička, Gothic Art, Aleš South Bohemian Gallery 2008, p. 17-18, ISBN 978-80-86952-57-4
- Hynek Rulíšek, Gotické umění jižních Čech, Průvodce, sv. 3, p. 18-20, Alšova jihočeská galerie v Hluboké nad Vltavou 1989, ISBN 80-900057-6-4
- Jaroslav Pešina, Desková malba, in: Dějiny českého výtvarného umění I/1, Academia Praha 1984
- Jaroslav Pešina, Studie k ikonografii a typologii obrazu madony s dítětem v českém deskovém malířství kolem poloviny 14. století, Umění XXV, 1977
- Věra Frömlová, Adorace děcka z Hluboké, Umění 19, 1971, p. 576-585
- Jaroslav Pešina, Desková malba, in: České umění gotické 1350–1420, Academia Praha 1970
- Vladimír Denkstein, František Matouš, Jihočeská gotika, Praha 1953
- Antonín Matějček, Česká malba gotická, Melantrich Praha 1950
