= Madonna of Žebrák =

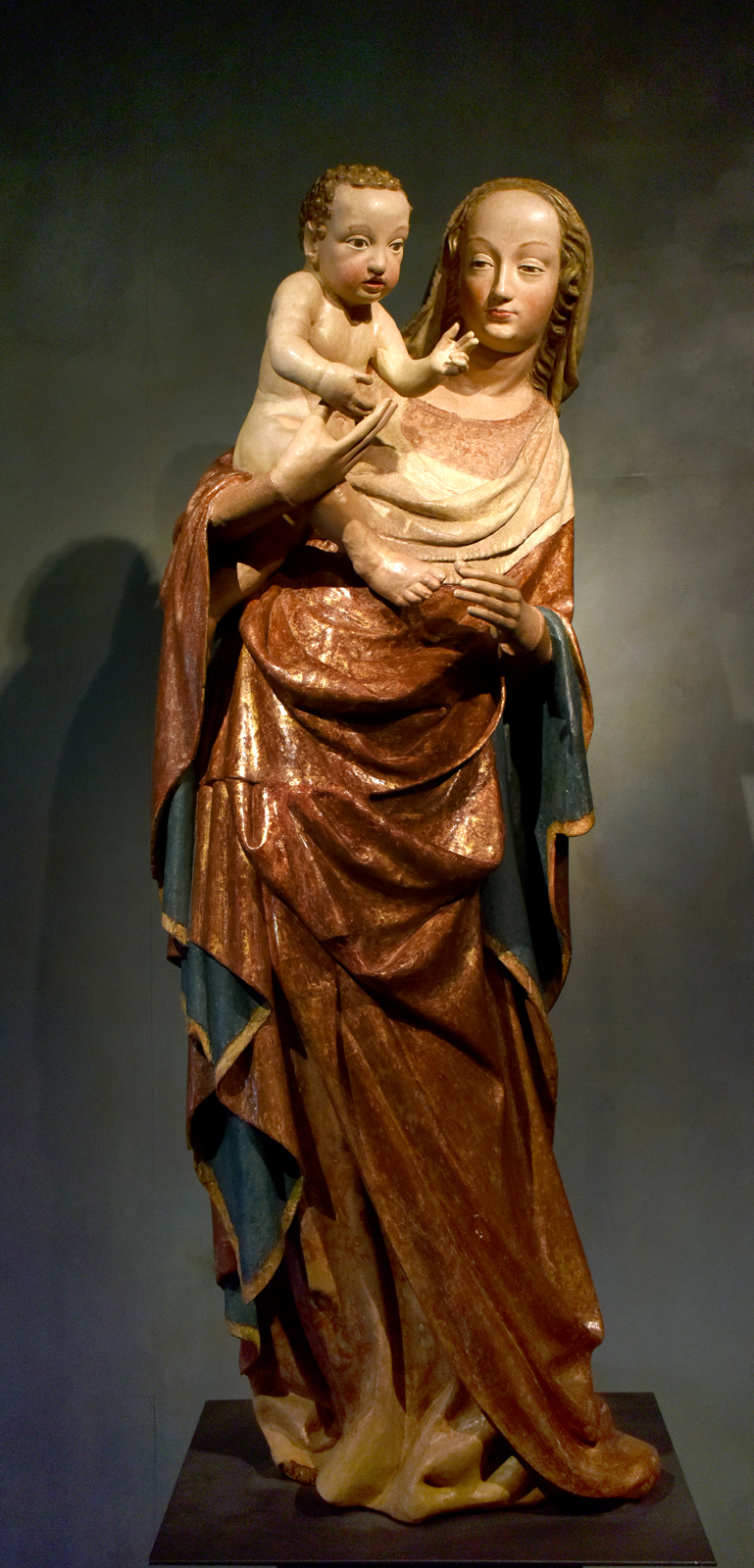
Madonna of Žebrák (around 1380), National Gallery Prague

Madonna of Žebrák (c. 1380) is a fully sculpted Gothic wooden statue, the work of an anonymous carver known as the Master of the Madonna of Žebrák, who worked at the same time as the Master of the Třeboň Altarpiece and was close to him in his artistic style. The sculpture occupies an exceptionally important place in the development of Czech sculpture of the late 14th century and forms a wooden counterpart to the beautiful Madonnas carved in marlstone. As a loan from the parish church of St. Lawrence in Žebrák, it is on display in the exposition of medieval art of the National Gallery in Prague.

== Description and classification ==
Fully sculpted wooden statue with elaborate back side, height 135 cm. The polychrome and parts of the Virgin's hair and veil date from a later period.

The tall and slender statue of the Virgin Mary is strongly bent to the right side, on which she carries the naked Christ Child. Her lower garment is almost completely covered by a richly ruffled cloak, in which the fleshly core of the statue is lost. Over her shoulders is a kind of cape which reaches down to her calves at the back and forms a curved horizontal border on her abdomen at the front. Its tips, draped over the arms, form long curtains at the sides. On the lightened left side, the cloak forms alternating loose folds, the last of which reaches to the ground. Mary's veil falls over her back and is drawn in an arc across her breasts in front. Mary's serious face is ovoid in shape, with a high forehead, far apart closed eyes, pouting lips and a small chin with a hint of a double chin. The cross-legged Jesus repeats a scheme known in older 14th-century statues (Madonna of the Old Town Hall).

The upper part of the sculpture is close to the stone sculptures of the St. Vitus Cathedral workshop and in some features it resembles the Madonna of the Old Town Hall in Prague, especially in the draping of the garment on the chest. By stretching the sculpture to height, it lost some of its body volume, and the shortening of the upper part of the body changed the proportions that foreshadowed the canon of the beautiful style. The multiplication of the drapery folds, which are no longer tied to the body core, takes on a decorative character. At the bottom, the drapery is linearly stylized and features for the first time a reversible hairline fold stretching to the ground, which, together with the bowl-like folds in the middle of the body, is typical of later sculptures of the beautiful style. The hairline fold on the side of the free leg has its origins in the antiquizing counterpoint of 13th-century sculptures, which brought about the stretching of the folds on the side opposite the extended hip. In the case of the Madonna of Žebrák, the original meaning of this motif has disappeared and it now fulfils an entirely formal function. St. John the Evangelist of Trebon had a similar hairline fold of the drapery before the lower part of the statue was destroyed by rotting.

The closest parallels can be found in the painting of the Master of the Třeboň Altarpiece, for example in St. Margaret in the panel painting Madonna between St. Bartholomew and St. Margaret (1390). The drapery of the Madonna's cloak is rather loose and improvised, and the execution is softly indeterminate. The Madonna of Žebrák stands at the crossroads of sculptural styles and represents one of the initial sources from which the beautiful style grew. Art historian Albert Kutal has even speculated that the Madonna of Žebrák may have formed the centre of an altarpiece with painted wings from the workshop of the Master of the Třeboň Altarpiece.

The works of the Master of the Madonna of Žebrák are characterized by a complex linear organization of drapery, a softly indeterminate surface treatment and a passive gliding posture like the figures in the panel paintings of the Master of the Třeboň Altarpiece. The art historian Jaromír Homolka saw the formal starting point of the Madonna of Žebrák in a group of seated madonnas of the 1970s (Madonna of Bečov, Madonna of Hrádek u Konopiště), which are associated with her painterly conception and richness of drapery with elongated, low and compressed folds. These features are also shared by both Madonnas, for example, with the illuminations of the Gospel of John of Opava from 1368. In the modelling of the face, which retained the lofty solemnity of the preceding period, the sculptor was also influenced by the St. Vitus Cathedral workshop of Peter Parler. Kutal emphasised the close affinity with the more stylistically advanced Madonna of Lava, with which the Madonna of Žebrák is linked by the movement of the body with the hip excessively extended over the supporting leg, as well as the identical modelling of the hands and face.

=== Other works ===
- St. John the Evangelist from the Augustinian Church of St. Giles in Třeboň, Master of the Madonna of Žebrák
- Crucifix from the Augustinian Church of St. Giles in Třeboň, Master of the Madonna of Žebrák
- Madonna of Lava (private property, Austria)
- Madonna from the parish church in Kozojedy, Master of the Madonna of Žebrák - workshop
- St. Catherine and St. Barbara from the church of St. Thomas, Master of the Madonna of Žebrák - workshop ?
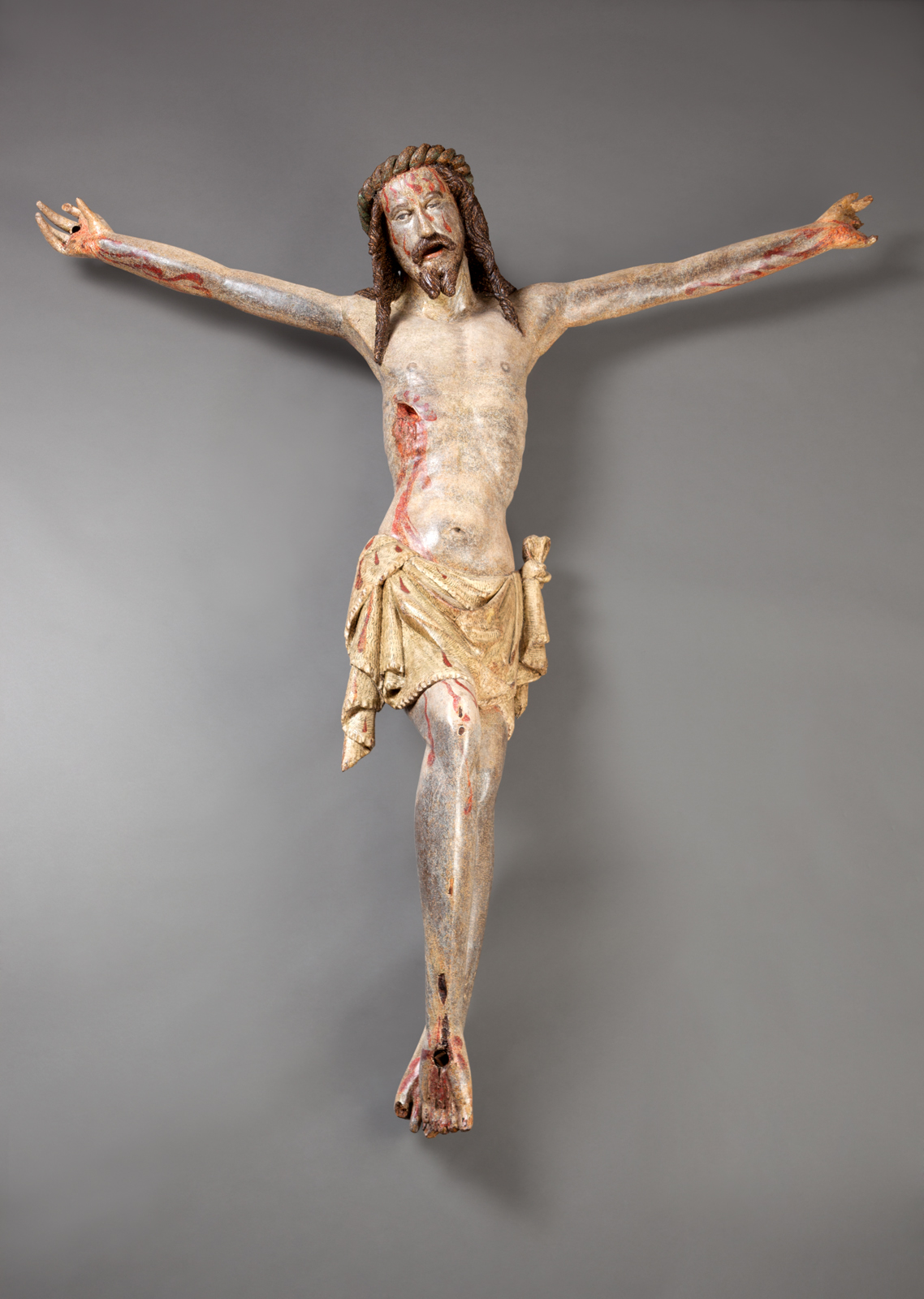
Crucified from Třeboň, Master of the Madonna of Žebrák, Aleš South Bohemian Gallery in Hluboká nad Vltavou

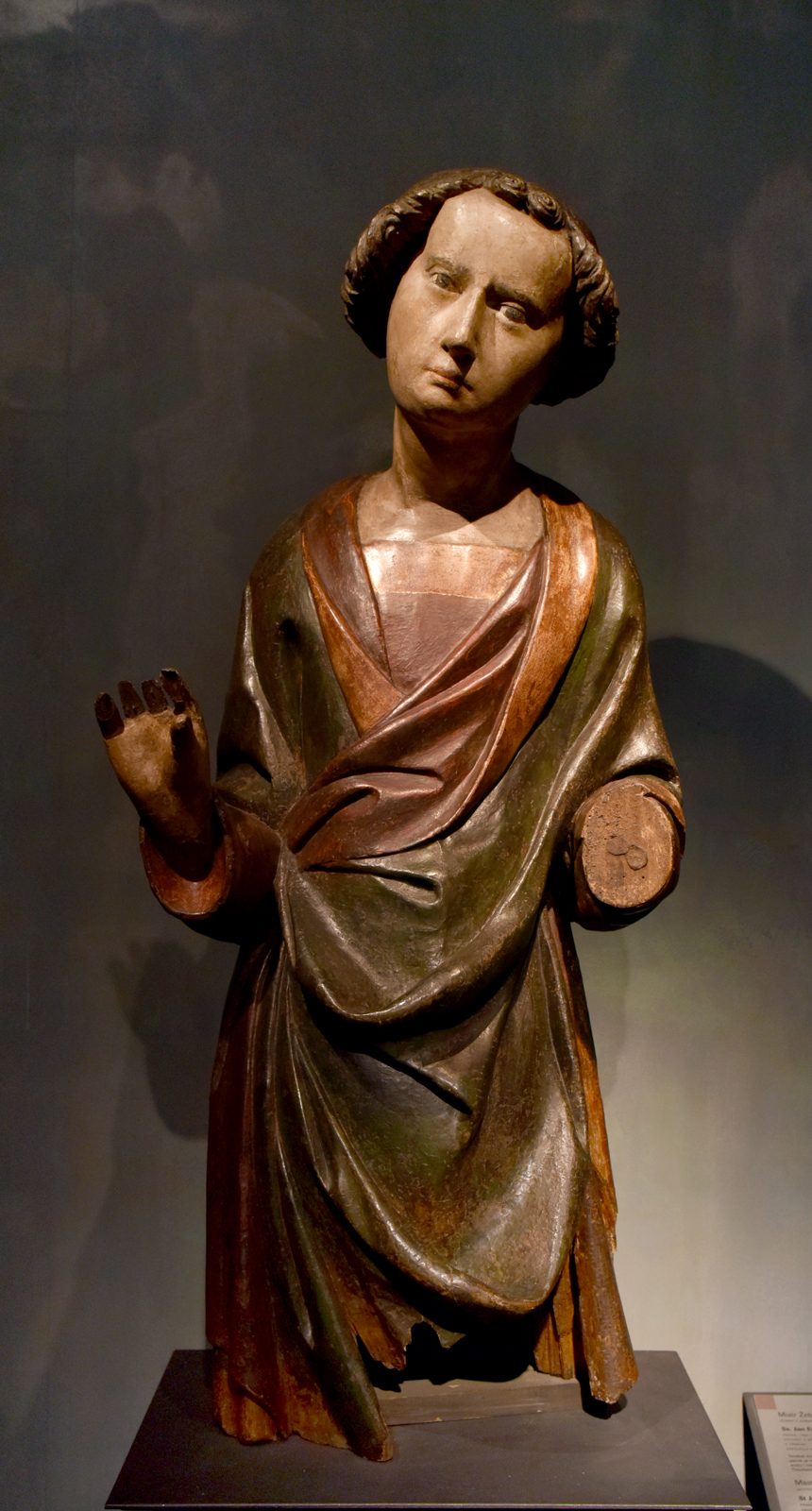
St. John the Evangelist of Třeboň, Master of the Madonna of Žebrák (1380–1390), National Gallery Prague

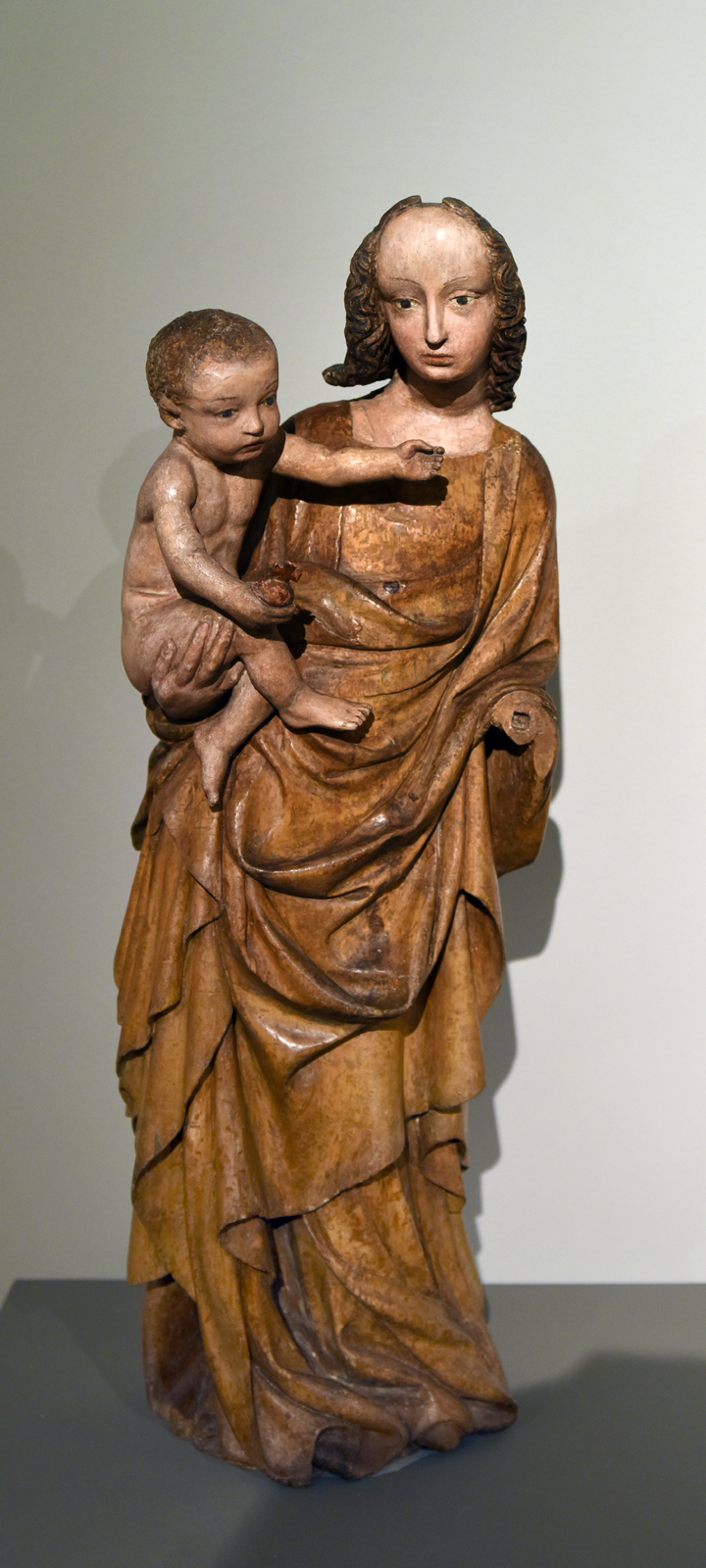
Madonna of Kozojedy (80s of the 14th century)

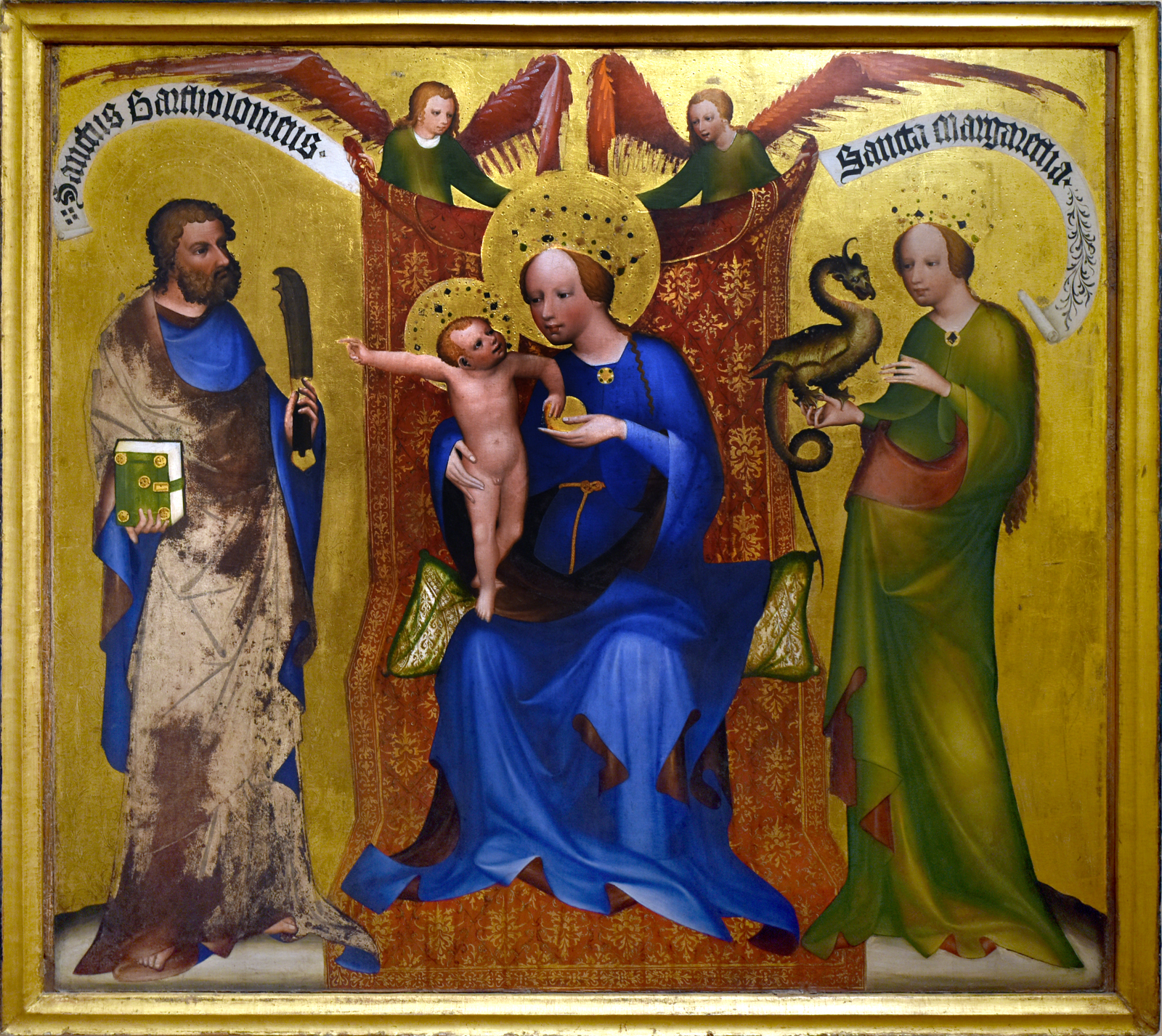
Madonna between St. Bartholomew and St. Margaret (c. 1390), Aleš South Bohemian Gallery in Hluboká nad Vltavou

== Sources ==
- Jiří Fajt, Štěpánka Chlumská, Bohemia and Central Europe 1220-1550, National Gallery in Prague 2014, ISBN 978-80-7035-569-5, pp. 53-57
- Albert Kutal, "Gothic Sculpture", in: History of Czech Fine Arts I, Academia, Prague 1984
- Albert Kutal, Czech Gothic Art, Obelisk Prague 1972
- Albert Kutal, "Sculpture", in: Kavka F (ed.), Czech Gothic Art 1350-1420, Academia, Prague 1970
- Albert Kutal, Czech Gothic Sculpture 1350-1450, SNKLU, Prague, 1962
