= Madonna of Roudnice =

Painting by the Master of the Třeboň Altarpiece

Madonna of Roudnice. 90 x 68 cm. Tempera on limewood panel.

The Roudnice Madonna is a work by the Bohemian Master of the Třeboň Altarpiece from the period between 1385 and 1390. It came from the monastery of the Augustinian Canons in Roudnice nad Labem or from the Roudnice summer residence of Archbishop Jan of Jenštejn. The painting has been exhibited since 1946 in the permanent collection of medieval art at the National Gallery in Prague.

== Description and context ==
The picture is painted in tempera on a lime-wood panel covered with canvas and a chalk base with an engraved drawing. It is 90 x 68 cm, including the original frame. In the 18th century the entire picture was painted over and an opening for a relic was carved out in the place where the Madonna's gold clasp had originally been. It would in all likelihood have stored part of Mary's veil spattered by the blood of Christ (peplum cruentatum). It was Karel Chytil who, in 1925, drew attention to the picture's Gothic origin, finding a crown and embossing on the basis of a photographic image. In 1946, Pavel Kropáček found the picture's engraved drawing, dating from about 1400, in an X-ray scan. In 1946 the picture was restored and, following the removal of subsequent overpainting, the original Gothic painting was revealed in almost its entirety and the gilding was also restored.

The Roudnice Madonna represents the most popular type of Bohemian Madonnas that was subsequently much copied. Madonna from the Vyšší Brod and the Madonna of the Church of the Holy Trinity in České Budějovice were derived from the iconography of the Roudnice Madonna. The conception of the Roudnice Madonna's painting is closely related to the figure of St Catherine from the "Třeboň altarpiece" as well as to early sculptural works in the International Gothic style (such as the "Plzeň Madonna" and the "Madonna of Altenmarkt"). The elegant faces and compositional integration of the mother and child, who turns and raises up his arms towards her, are the portrayal of sensitive emotion and maternal love. The picture's gentle chiaroscuro modelling, sophistication of form, conception of the drapery and pure, radiant colour represent one of the most valuable examples of the International Gothic style.

=== Related works ===
- The Madonna of the Hospital Church of the Holy Trinity, České Budějovice
- Madonna from Vyšší Brod (Hohenfurth)
- The Madonna from the Cathedral of John the Baptist in Wrocław
