= Master of the Třeboň Altarpiece =

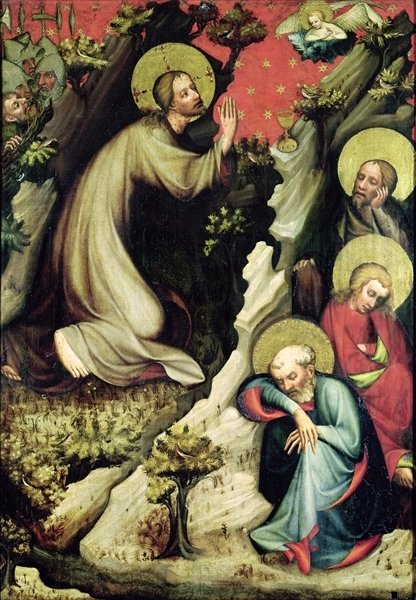
Christ on the Mount of Olives, from the Třeboň Altarpiece

The Master of the Třeboň Altarpiece (German: Master of Wittingau) was a Bohemian painter active in Prague around 1380–1390. His name is derived from the Třeboň Altarpiece from the church of Saint Giles at the Augustinian convent of Třeboň (known in German as "Wittingau"). The triptych depicts Christ on the Mount of Olives, The Tomb of Christ, and the Resurrection. It has been dated to around 1380, and is today held at the Convent of St. Agnes branch of the National Gallery in Prague.

Stylistically, the master seems to have been aware of French painting; in addition. he created the so-called "beautiful style", a Bohemian variant of the International Gothic style in which figures are placed in deep settings and modeled with chiaroscuro; such intensity had never before been seen in Bohemian art, but would be prominent in the work of future generations of artists. In addition, the master's influence can be seen in the work of other European artists of the period, most especially the Master of the Bamberg Altar.

A painting of Our Lady of Sorrows by the master, painted before 1380, once hung in the church of Církvice; a Madonna in Roudnice is now in Prague. The painter is also responsible for an Adoration of the Child in the castle of Hluboká Castle and a Crucifixion and a St. Mary of the Altar of Heaven in Prague; the latter is one of the first known Bohemian paintings to be displayed with a decorated frame as part of the composition. In addition, the Virgin with Saint Bartholomew and Saint Margaret, also in Hluboká, is believed to be by his hand.

== Gallery ==
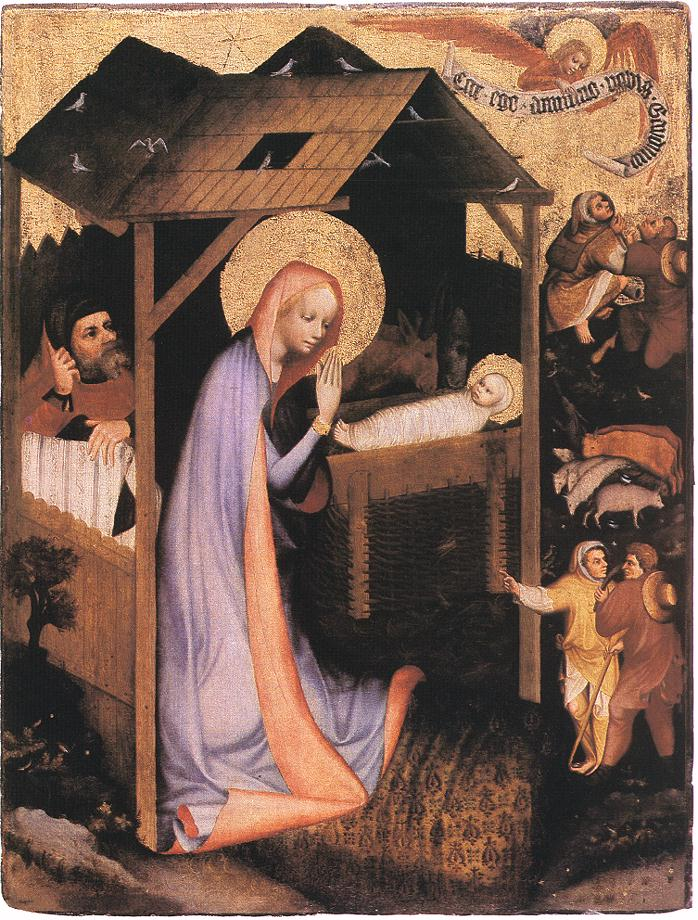
Adoration of Jesus, before 1380, Aleš South Bohemian Gallery in Hluboká nad Vltavou

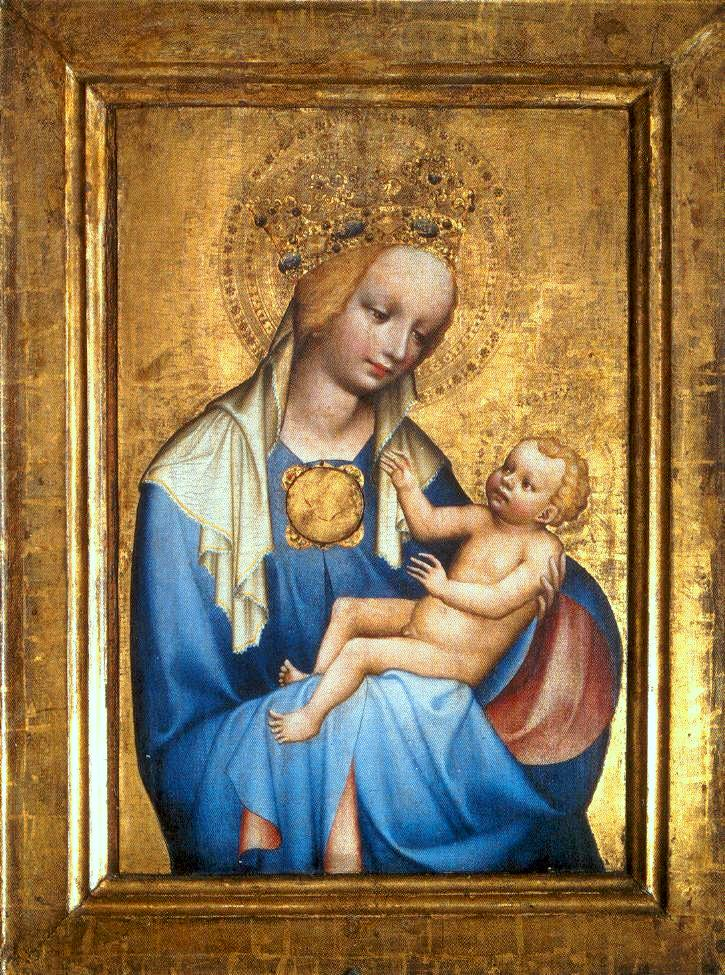
Madonna of Roudnice, c 1385–1390, National Gallery Prague

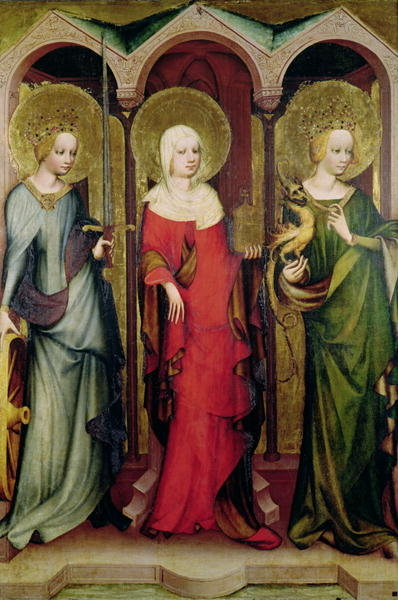
From the Třeboň Altarpiece; Saints Catherine, Mary Magdalene and Margaret, National Gallery Prague

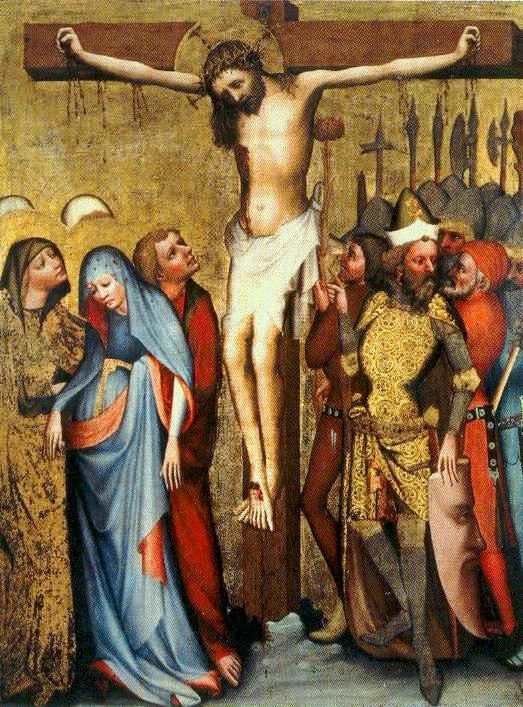
Crucifixion from Svatá Barbora, National Gallery Prague

== See also ==
- Adoration of Our Lord from Hluboká
- Třeboň Altarpiece

== Sources ==
- Baragli, Sandra. European Art of the Fourteenth Century. LA: J. Paul Getty Museum, 2007. ISBN 0-8923-6859-4
- Chilvers, Ian. The Oxford Dictionary of Art. Oxford: Oxford University Press, 2004. ISBN 0-1986-0476-9
- Hourihane, Colum. The Grove Encyclopedia of Medieval Art and Architecture, Volume 2. Oxford: Oxford University Press, 2012. ISBN 0-1953-9536-0
- Suckale, Robert. Gothic. Cologne: Taschen. ISBN 3-8228-5292-9
