= Ambras sketchbook =

Set of 56 small-format drawings

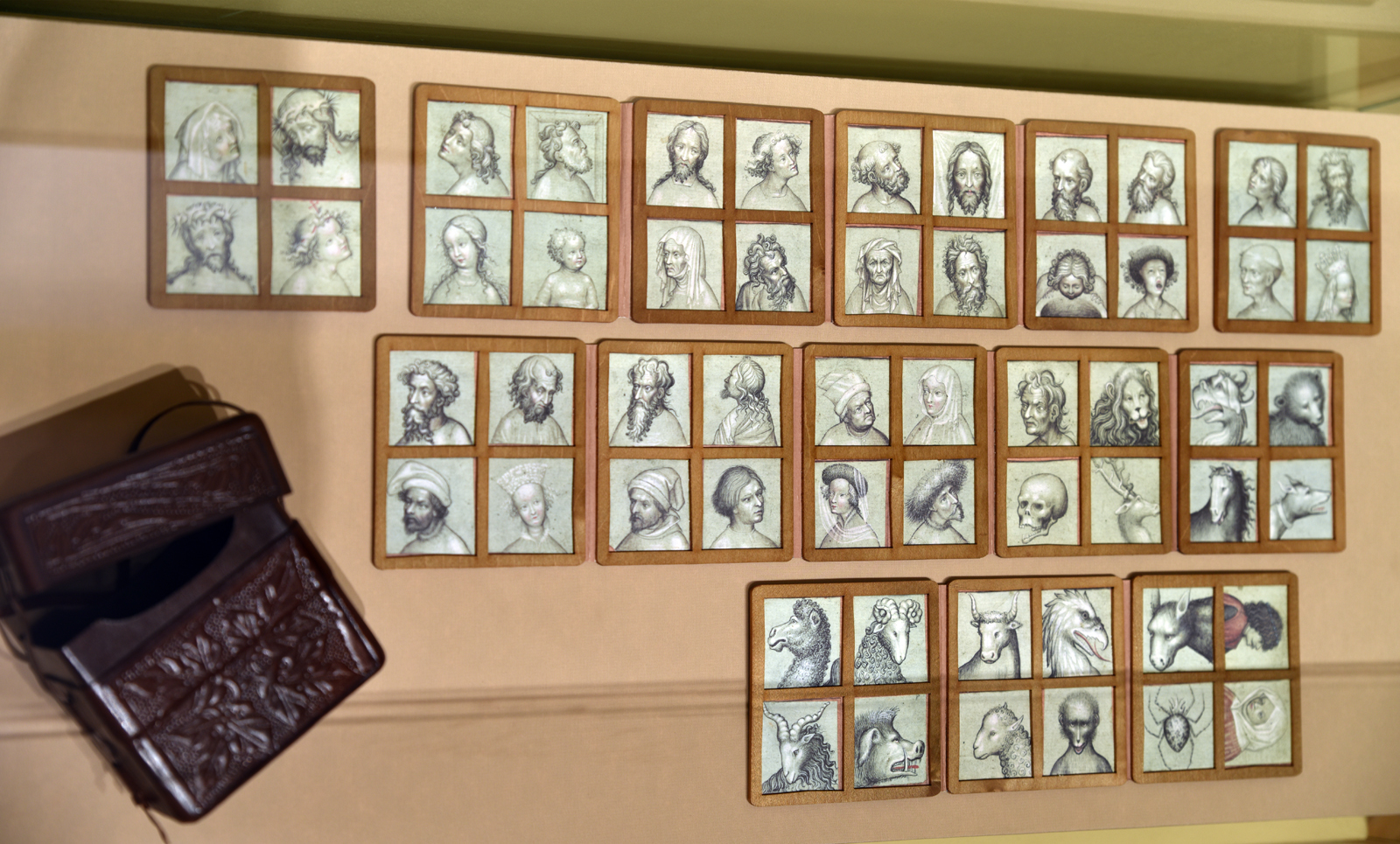
Ambras sketchbook (c. 1410), Kunsthistorisches Museum, Vienna (facsimile)

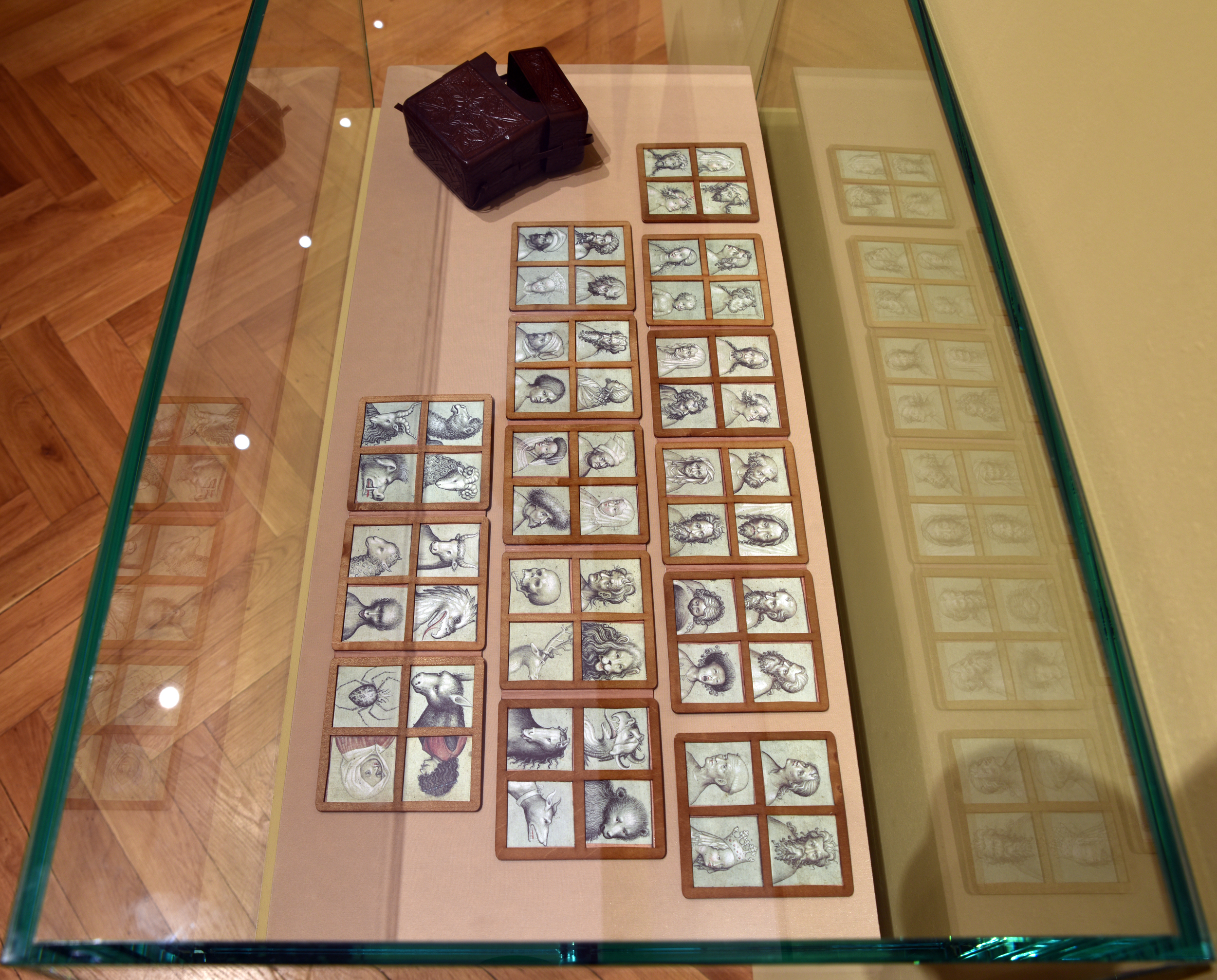
Ambras sketchbook (c. 1410), Kunsthistorisches Museum, Vienna (facsimile)

Ambras sketchbook (c.1410) is a rare set of 56 small-format drawings on 14 wooden plates that has survived in its entirety. It was in the collections of the Ferdinand II, Archduke of Austria at Ambras Castle and hence its designation in the literature. This work comes from the Prague artistic community and represents a sampling of faces from different phases of the development of the beautiful style, for which the panel paintings of Master of the Třeboň Altarpiece or the sculptural works of Master of the Týn Calvary and his workshop were a model. The sketchbook is also related to the typology of faces of the so-called Capuchin Cycle. Ambras sketchbook is in the collection of the Kunsthistorisches Museum in Vienna.

== Description and classification ==
The sketchbook contains a total of 56 drawings, arranged in groups of four on 9.5 × 9 cm maple plates and bound with parchment into a leporello. The drawings are executed in silver pencil on specially treated greenish paper and painted with a fine brush in black ink, modelled in places with white and red accents. In character they are close to the early drawings of "Master of Mandeville's Travelogue", who was court illuminator to Wenceslaus IV and also illustrator of the Gerona Martyrology. The artist demonstrates his virtuosity, for example, in the many variations of hairstyles and beards, but the faces are stylized and typified. The execution using the semi-grisaille technique suggests that the artist worked in the field of book painting.

The plates were arranged in two sets of eight and four drawings, leaving two loose. An original leather case decorated with acanthus ornaments survives with the sketchbook. Originally the pattern book was probably arranged in three hierarchical groups - biblical figures, profane persons in contemporary clothing and animal forms. Two portraits of a woman and a man are by a different artist, active in the 1530s.

The drawings are clearly dominated by elements derived from the Bohemian milieu, and the sketchbook depicts some codified facial types of the beautiful style. Art historians believe that the set of drawings was made by an anonymous journeyman painter who was also familiar with Franco-Flemish-oriented Bohemian book painting (Master of the Antwerp Bible). The head of the crucified Christ is of the same type as in the Crucifixion from St. Barbara by the Master of the Třeboň Altarpiece, while the head of the saint next to the crowned Virgin Mary is related to St. Giles from the Třeboň Altarpiece. The heads of some of the apostles from the sketchbook or St. Sigismund, which is close to the same saint on the Votive Plate from Dubeček (sometimes considered a crypto-portrait of Zikmund of Luxembourg), are also typical of the works of the Master of the Třeboň Altarpiece. Analogies with the Pähl Altarpiece, mentioned in the literature, are also related to the work of Master of the Třeboň Altarpiece. The Northern Italian component of the International Style is recalled by the drinking and singing figures depicted from above and from below. A few drawings, which depart from the formalist attachment to the beautiful style, already have the character of naturalistic portraiture. This is particularly true of drawings of villains - for example, the face considered to be the prototype of the villain for the Crucifixion scene.

The author of the drawings had a flair for the plastic rendering of some of the heads, which may have had their origin in woodcuts from the workshop of Master of Týn Calvary (The Man of Sorrows from the New Town Hall in Prague) and other sculptural works (St. Nicholas of Vyšší Brod, St. Sigismund from the frame of St. Vitus Madonna). The portraits of St. Peter and St. Paul in the sketchbook are closely related to the reliquary busts of the two apostles from the Archbishop's Palace in Prague. The artist was probably inspired by the type and composition of the apostolic heads of the Capuchin Cycle, which are close to him in their degree of simplification of form. Some scholars have speculated that he may have worked in the same workshop where the cycle was created. In contrast to the smooth modelling of the heads of the Capuchin Cycle, however, the sketchbook drawings are starkly realistic, with a tendency towards naturalism. They also represent a greater range of human types. Younger analogies with the sketchbook drawings can be found in mural painting (fragment from the house U tykví in Michalská Street in Prague (after 1420), Museum of the City of Prague).

In the drawing of faces, the sketch is close to the author of the Annunciation scene (Fogg Art Museum, Cambridge), the author of the Bamberg Rationale from Pommersfelden, or the painter of the Mettener Armenbibel (Biblia pauperum) (1414-1415) from the Bayerische Staatsbibliotek.

Originally, the entire set probably served as a workshop specimen of individual compositional elements for sacred panel painting at the turn of the 14th and 15th centuries. It was an aid for reproducing as faithfully as possible the paintings or sculptures that were considered to be the artistic canon (model to be imitated). The animal heads here represent contemporary astronomical motifs or moral allegories. In the 16th century, sketchbooks were replaced by printed manuals and graphic sheets reproducing the most famous paintings and sculptures.

=== Details ===
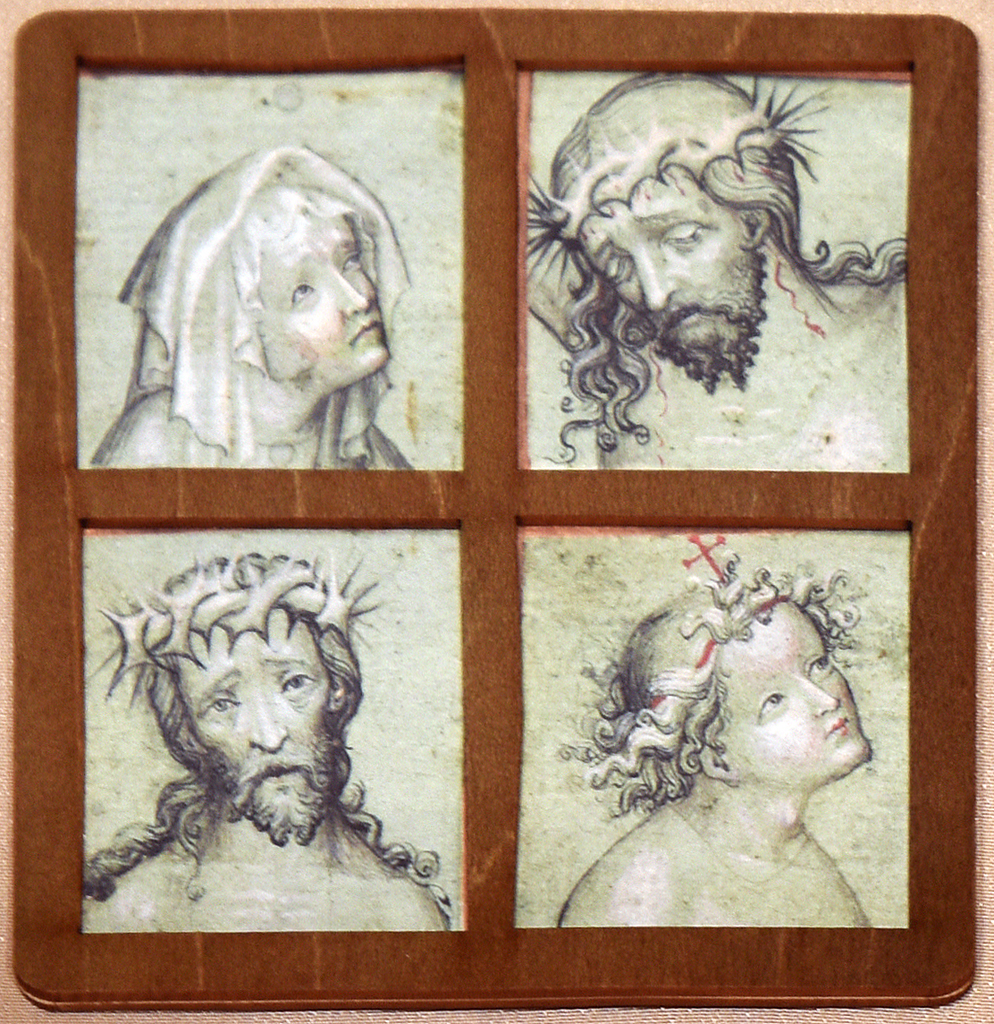
Ambras sketchbook (detail)

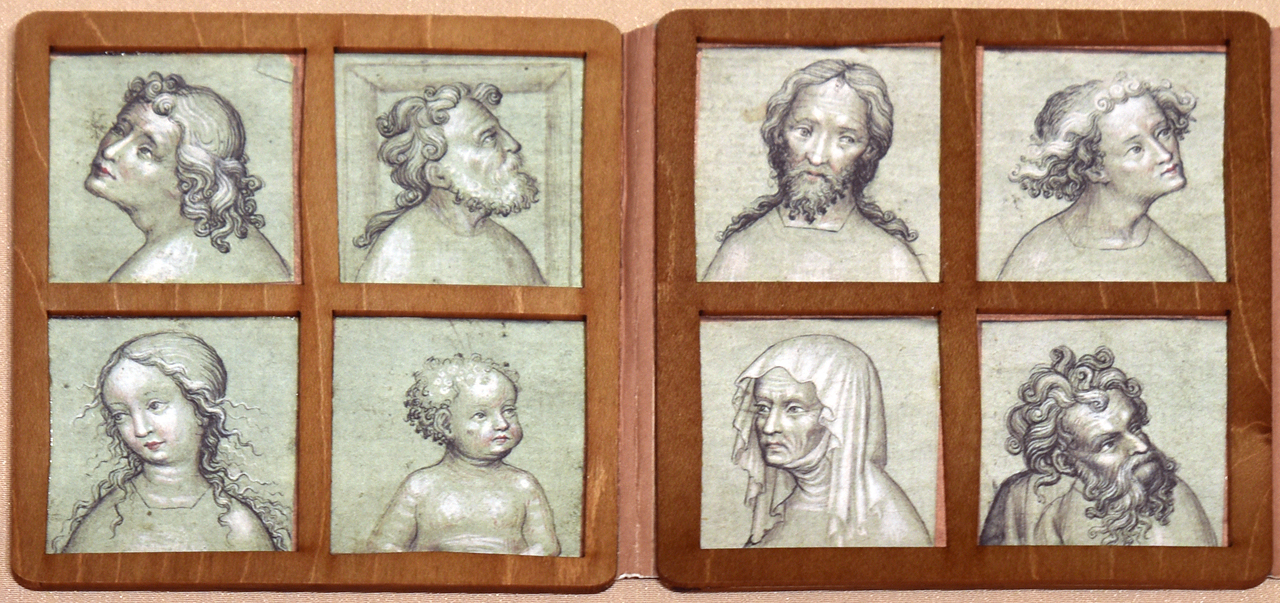
Ambras sketchbook (detail) III

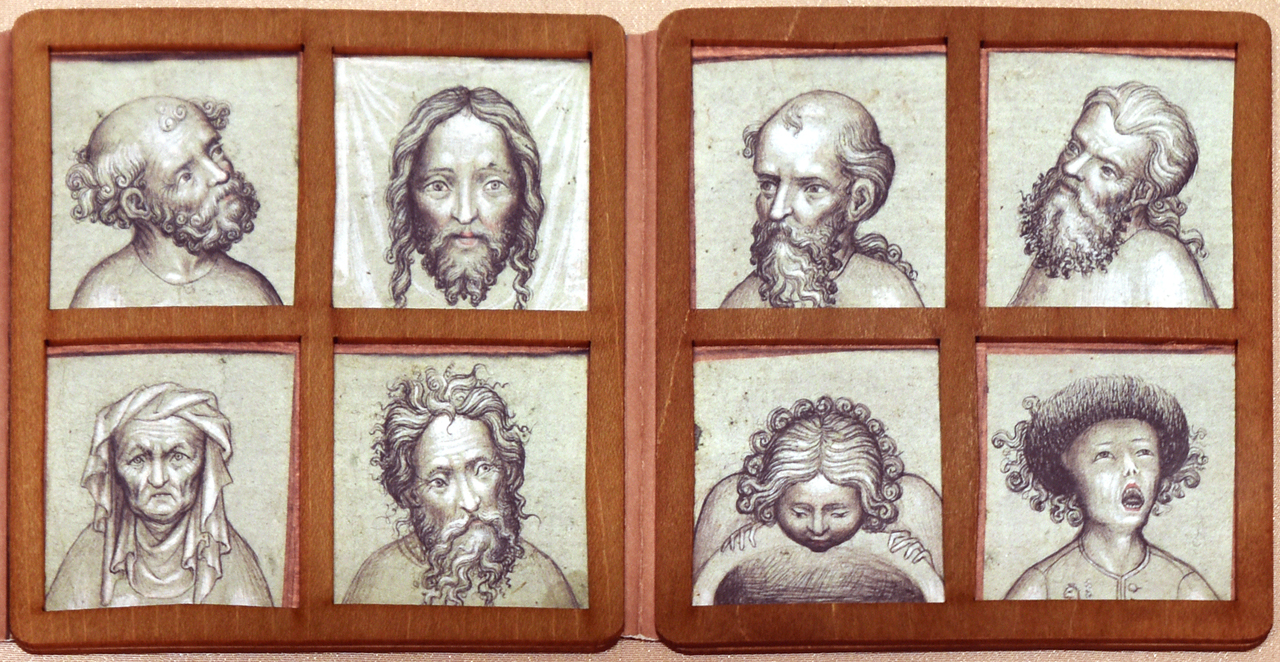
Ambras sketchbook (detail) II

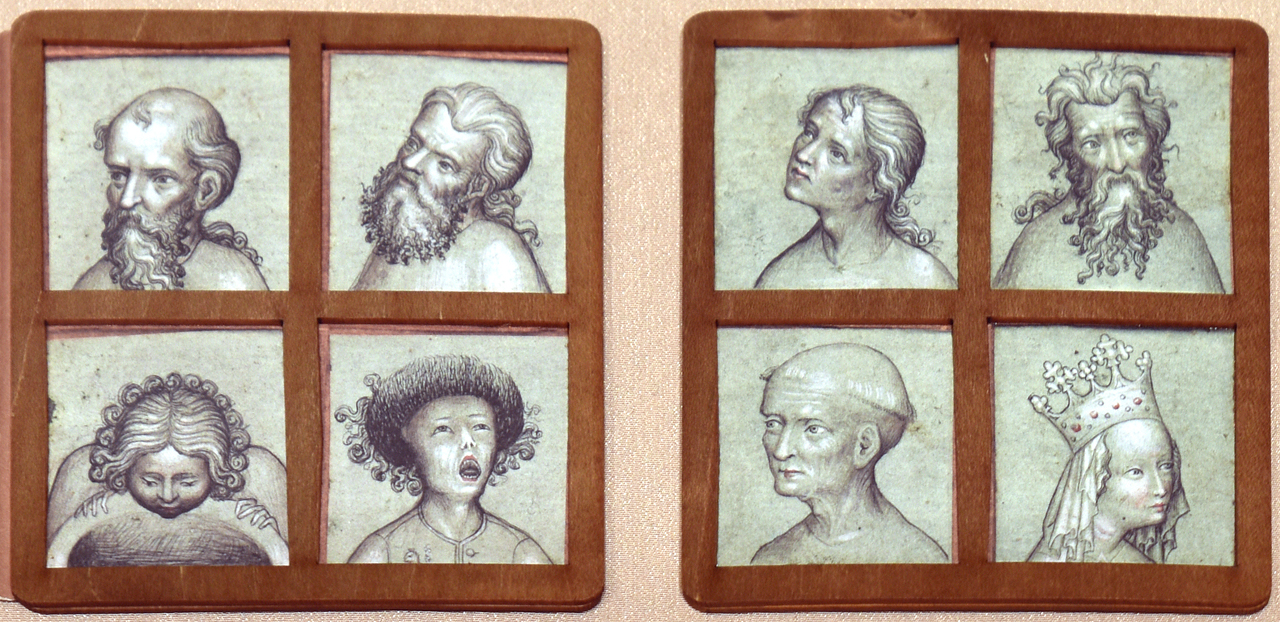
Ambras sketchbook (detail) IV

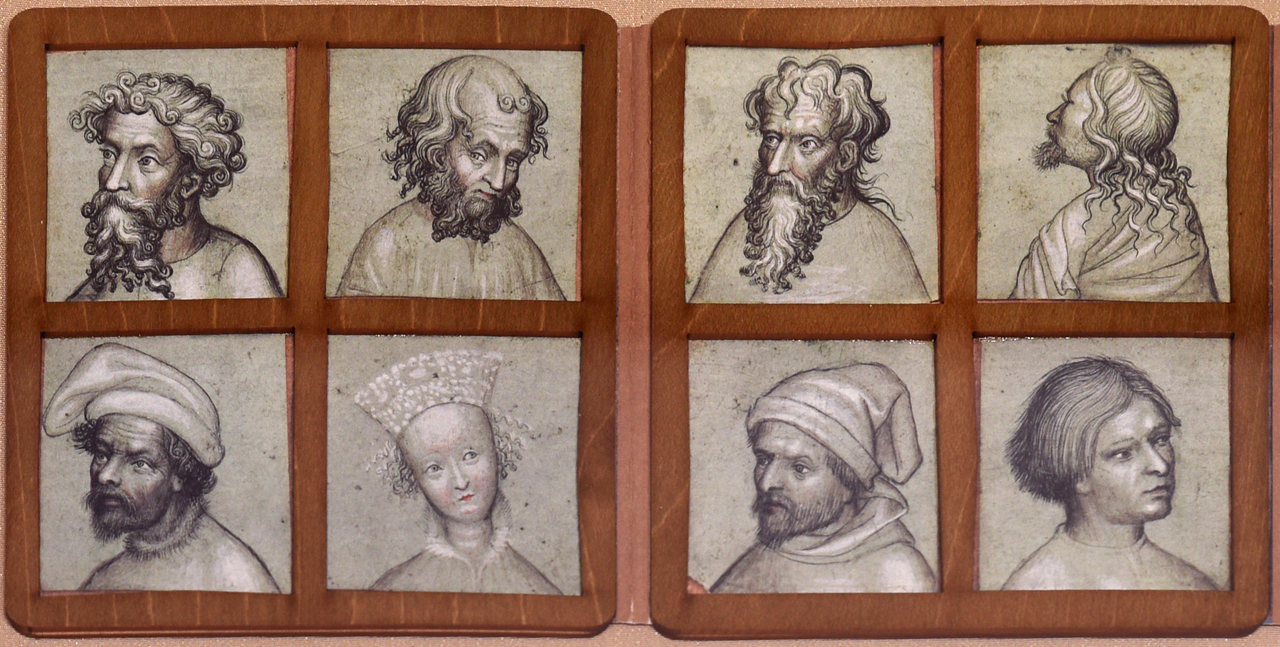
Ambras sketchbook (detail) V

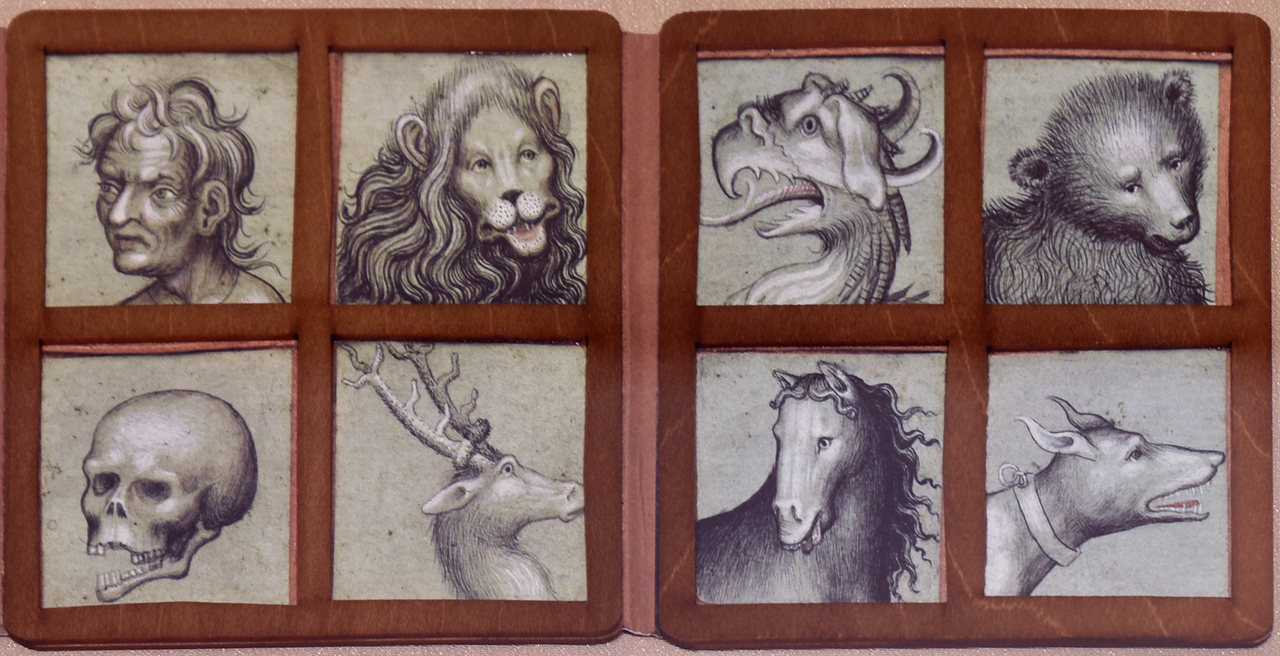
Ambras sketchbook (detail) VI

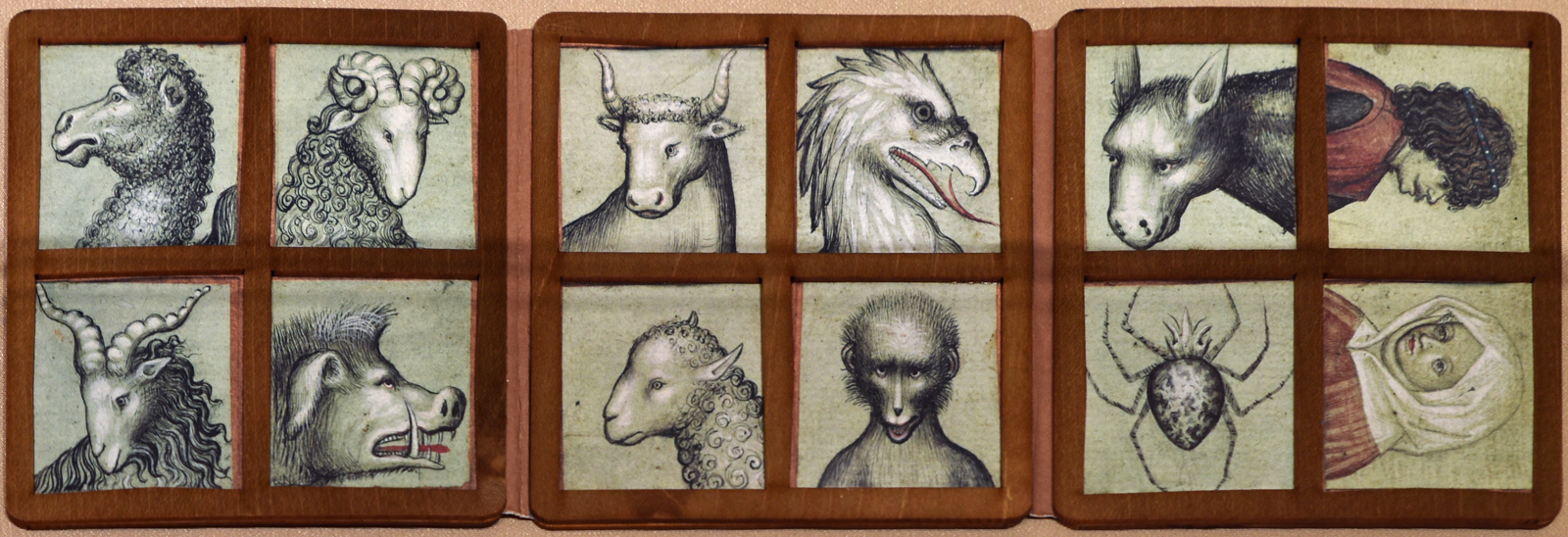
Ambras sketchbook (detail) VII

=== Related works ===
- Wolfenbüttel Musterbuch
- Das Braunschweiger Skizzenbuch, 1380-1420, Brunswick, Herzog Anton Ulrich Museum
- Gerona Martyrology
- Luzern Gradual
- Capuchin cycle

== Sources ==
- Milena Studničková, Nabídka dílenského repertoáru. Ambraský vzorník / Workshop repertoire offer. Ambras sketchbook, in: Taťána Petrasová, Rostislav Švácha (eds.), Dějiny umění v českých zemích 800–2000, Arbor vitae a Artefactum, Praha 2017, ISBN 978-80-904534-8-7 (Av), ISBN 978-80-88283-02-7 (Af), s. 264–265
- Lenka Janská, Digitalizace děl světového kulturního dědictví a její dopad na výtvarnou výchovu / Digitalization of works of world cultural heritage and its impact on art education, in: H. Myslivečková, V. Jurečková Mališová (eds.), Výtvarná výchova ve světě současného umění a technologií I, sborník konference, KVV, PedF, UP Olomouc 2012
- Jiří Fajt, Robert Suckale, Malířský vzorník ze zámku Ambras / Painting Sketchbook from Ambras Castle, in: Jiří Fajt (ed.) Karel IV., císař z Boží milosti. Kultura a umění za vlády Lucemburků 1310–1437 / Culture and art under the Luxembourg rule 1310-1437, Prague 2006, pp. 534-536
- Jiří Fajt, Robert Suckale, Mistr Kunc – Kapucínský cyklus / Master Kunc - The Capuchin Cycle, in: Jiří Fajt (ed.) Karel IV., císař z Boží milosti. Kultura a umění za vlády Lucemburků 1310–1437 / Culture and art under the Luxembourg rule 1310-1437, Prague 2006, pp. 538-539
- Homolka Jaromír, Chlíbec Jan, Šteflová Milena: Mistr Týnské kalvárie, katalog výstavy NG / Master of Týn Calvary, catalogue of the National gallery exhibition, Prague 1990
- Karel Stejskal, Nástěnné malířství 2. poloviny 14. a počátku 15. století, in: Dějiny českého výtvarného umění 1/I, / Wall Painting of the 2nd half of the 14th and early 15th century, in: History of Czech Fine Arts 1/I, Academia, Prague 1984
- Josef Krása, Knižní malba, in: Dějiny českého výtvarného umění 1/II / Book Painting, in: History of Czech Fine Arts 1/II, Academia, Prague 1984
- Zoroslava Drobná, Kresba, in: Kavka F (ed.), České umění gotické 1350–1420 / Drawing, in: Kavka F (ed.), Czech Gothic Art 1350-1420, Academia, Prague 1970
- Antonín Matějček, 'Česká malba gotická / Czech Gothic Painting, Melantrich, Prague 1950
- Pavel Kropáček, Malířství doby husitské / Painting of the Hussite Period, Prague 1946
