= Madonna of Zahražany =

The Madonna of Zahražany is a sculpture of Mary and the Infant Jesus which comes from the former convent of the Sisters of the Magdalene Order in Most-Zahražany (1281–1442). It was created before 1380 and is on permanent display at the National Gallery in Prague

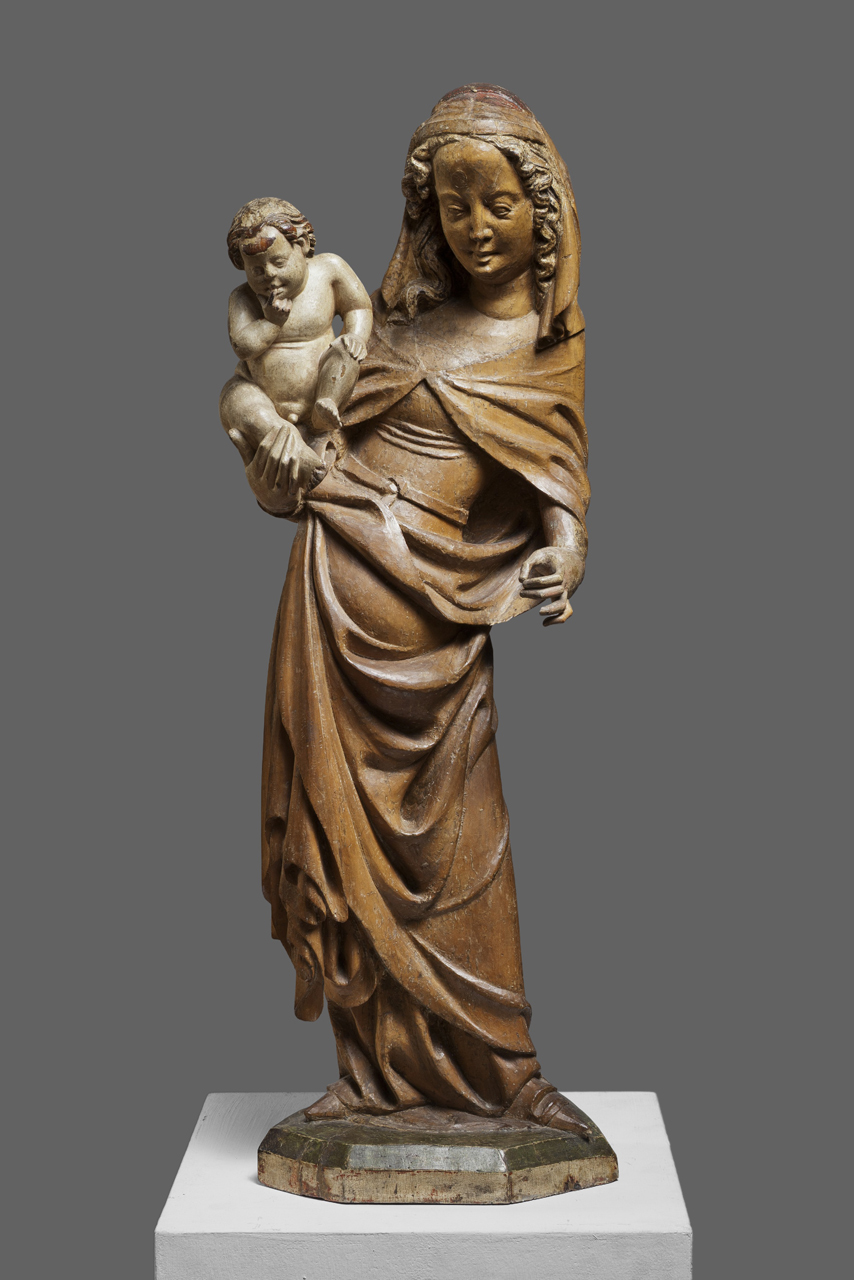
Madonna of Zahražany, National Gallery in Prague

== Description and context ==
The 84 cm tall sculpture is made of lime wood, with traces of the original polychromy. The strikingly S-shaped figure of the Madonna holds the Infant Jesus in her right arm. Putting his finger to his lips, Jesus symbolises the nuns’ vow of silence. The Virgin Mary's garments fit closely around her body, accentuating its natural movement and, on the right-hand side, compositionally balancing the figure of the child. The drapery is elaborated into an intricate system of folds and combines transverse deep hollows and the complex pleating of the merging bottom edges of her clothes. The use of perspectival shortening and the downward views of both Mary and the Infant Jesus indicate that the sculpture was originally located on a high console or in the uppermost part of an altar.

The Madonna of Zahražany is related to several wooden Enthroned Madonnas of the 1370s (such as those from Hrádek and Konopiště) and also to the stone sculpture of the "Madonna of the Old Town Hall" in Prague (1380) and the triforium bust of Blanche of Valois that were made by the St. Vitus Cathedral workshop. A figural type that corresponds with the Madonna of Zahražany appears in book painting ("The Gospel Book of Jan of Opava", 1368). The compositional scheme has a forerunner in the "Liber viaticus" (1354–64) and is repeated in a number of murals (Karlštejn, the Emmaus monastery) as well as in the figure of St Catherine in a panel painting from the Cistercian monastery in Vyšší Brod (Madonna between St Catherine and St Margaret, c. 1360).

The Madonna of Zahražany is exceptional high-quality and stylistically well-defined carving that, in the context of Central European sculpture of the third quarter of the 14th century, has no parallel in other workshop pieces. It represents an important stage of development and a stylistic shift in Bohemian Gothic sculpture from the Madonna of Michle towards the Madonnas of the International Gothic style.
