= Sternberg Madonna =

Medieval Sculpture

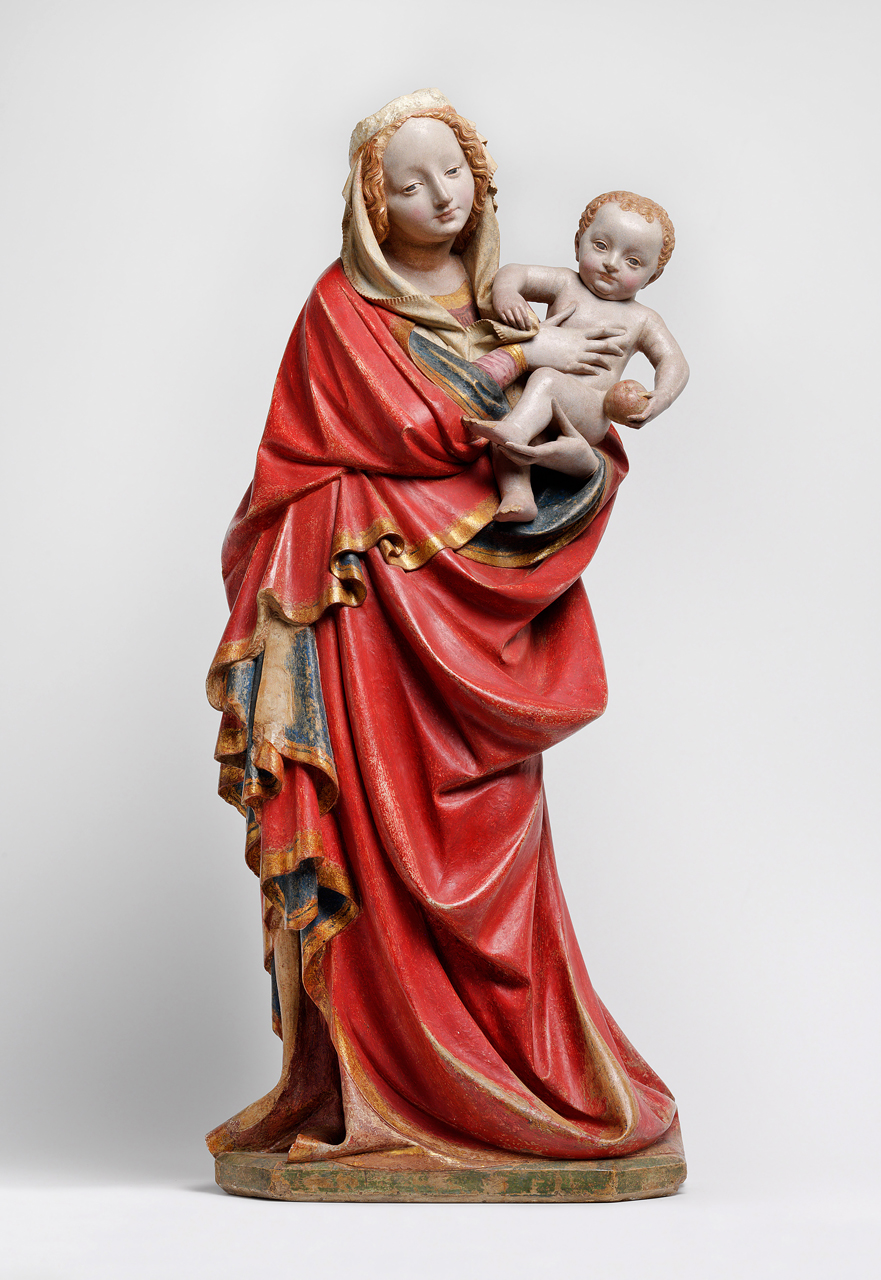
Sternberg Madonna (1390s), Olomouc Archdiocesan Museum

The Sternberg Madonna is one of the most important Czech madonnas in a beautiful style and a national cultural monument. Madonna was discovered in 1957 in the filial church in Babice, which was part of the property of the Sternberg family. It belongs to the group of "beautiful madonnas" from the circle of the Master of the Toruń Madonna. It is on display in the permanent exhibition of medieval sculpture in the Archdiocesan Museum Olomouc.

== Description of the statue ==
A sculpture in arenaceous marl measuring 84 x 37 x 18 cm, still with the original polychrome on a chalk ground and gilding on a bolus ground.

The Sternberg Madonna has a number of features in common with the "Silesian Madonnas" from Toruń, Wrocław, and Bonn, and Kutal is of the opinion that they all came from the same workshop, that of the Master of the Toruń Madonna. He considers the statues of St John from Třeboň and the Madonna of Venice (Kunstmuseum Düsseldorf) to be the initial types on which the Toruń circle based its work. [6] A special common feature of this group is the contravention of the principle of counterpoise, with the child being positioned above the free leg. These Madonnas are closely related to the sculptures from the Parler masons’ lodge. With their monumental impact, stocky build, and legs planted firmly apart, they differ from the second line of Beautiful Madonnas, represented by the Krumlov Madonna. The statues derived from the Krumlov model, by contrast, are incorporeally fragile and portrayed in a much more dynamic pose.

The mass of the Sternberg Madonna is distributed around a central axis between the head and the socle, and presents a static impression. The torso is covered by sumptuous drapery, extended in width and divided up by a wealth of generous bowl-shaped, hairpin-shaped, and tube-shaped folds. The Madonna has her legs placed wide apart, with the weight resting on the right leg and the right side jutting out. She holds the child above the free leg on the left side, from where the hem runs diagonally, gathered in the centre into meandering folds, and ending on the right side in a cascade of vertical overturned folds. The system of arranging the folds is consistent throughout the drapery, respecting the rules of movement and forming smooth transitions and connections. The only exception to this logic is the area below the right shoulder, which is not differentiated so much as the other parts. Transferring the Infant Jesus above the free leg deprives him of support, but this is replaced by a formal support in the form of a set of horizontal folds in the drapery in the area of the waist, which are wrapped around him. This renders superfluous a second system of vertical folds in the mantle below the left arm of the Madonna, which we find in the Krumlov type.

Unlike the slender, oval face of the Krumlov Madonna, the face of the Sternberg Madonna is wide and rounded, similar in type to the sculptures by the circle of the Master of the Toruń Madonna. The Sternberg Madonna resembles the Krumlov type in particular in the way the hair is curled and in the motif of the mother pressing the fingers of her right hand into the soft body of her child. This feature is logical for the Krumlov Madonna, where the weight of the child rests on the hand, but with the Sternberg Madonna it is a supplementary and objectively unnecessary gesture. The motif of the child playing with an apple, on the other hand, is found almost exclusively only with the Toruń type.

The lower part of the front side of the sculpture is a variant of the Toruń Madonna with only minor modifications, and repeats the whole system of the drapery arrangement, including the hairpin-shaped folds extending down the right side to the plinth. The main difference is in the figure of the Infant Jesus, who with the Toruń Madonna clasps the apple with both hands, whereas with the Sternberg Madonna he holds his mother’s veil in his right hand and is turned towards the viewers, as with the Madonna of Wroclaw. The Sternberg Mary does not have an apple in her right hand, but holds the body of the Infant Jesus. This means that the elbow comes across to the centre of the body and cannot hold down the mantle on the right side. Also absent is the circular movement of the folds, which with both related Madonnas are wrapped around the apple as the central point of the psychological relationships, where the hands of mother and child meet. [11] The veil of the Virgin Mary is not stylised into tubular shapes, but spreads out loosely, and the Infant Jesus holds one tip of it in his hand. This motif and the face of the Madonna have their model in the panel painting of the Madonna of Veveří.

The reverse side of the statue, where the mantle is arranged into regular vertical folds running from the shoulders down to the plinth, is almost identical with the Madonna of Wroclaw, the Madonna in the LVR-LandesMuseum in Bonn, or the Krumlov Madonna. The reverse side of the Sternberg Madonna was originally fully three-dimensional, but has been damaged through being trimmed off.

In the opinion of Fajt and Suckale, the whole composition of the sculpture refers to Jesus’ future passion and death, and attention is drawn towards the child by Mary’s movement and gesture and the conception of the drapery. The mother holds the child firmly with her right hand across his naked body, and at the same time draws him back as though she wants to protect him. With her left hand she raises his foot in a premonition that it will be pierced with a nail. The Infant Jesus, with an un-childlike serious expression, clasps an apple representing a symbol of salvation. This conception of the compassionate Madonna, who knows in advance what suffering awaits her child, is based on the mystic vision of St Bridget of Sweden.

== The identity of the sculptor ==
After removing later layers of polychrome from the reverse side of the statue, an inscription was found carved into the chalk ground layer, consisting of the three Gothic minuscule letters “hen” with the abbreviation “us”, which is the signature of the artist and may mean hen(ricus). For this reason, the sculptor responsible for the Sternberg Madonna is usually thought to have been Heinrich IV Parler (Heinrich of Gmünd), nephew of Peter Parler and foreman in the Parler masons’ lodge at St Vitus Cathedral in Prague. However, artefacts that are well documented as being the work of Heinrich of Gmünd, such as the archivolt of the St Peter portal in Cologne Cathedral or the Pietà in the Church of St Thomas in Brno throw doubt on this attribution because they display considerable differences in style. Furthermore, in the weekly accounts of St Vitus Cathedral Heinrich is referred to using a four-letter abbreviation as “henr(icus)”.

Since statues in the Beautiful Style are connected with the Parler masons’ lodge, Hlobil has proposed a different interpretation of the abbreviation, reading it as Hen(us), in other words Hans, and has suggested that the Sternberg Madonna may be the work of Johann, the younger son of Peter Parler. Johann was master of works at the masons’ lodge of St Vitus Cathedral in 1398-1406, following in the footsteps of his father and his older brother Wenzel. Wenzel and Johann are evidently identical with the “Junkers of Prague”, who in 1404 supplied a Pietà for Strasbourg Cathedral (which has not survived). In addition, in 1990 Lothar Schultes identified Wenzel Parler, who was master of works at St Stephen’s Cathedral in Vienna in 1399–1404, as being the Master of the Krumlov Madonna, although he later abandoned this opinion. The sculptural decoration of these works from the time at which the two artists were active has a different character, and the identification of the "Junkers of Prague" as the sculptors of the Sternberg Madonna thus remains merely a hypothesis.

The connection between the Sternberg Madonna and statues in the pilgrimage church of Ptujska Gora in Slovenia, the work of the Master of St James, is explained by researchers as the result of the arrival of a group of stonemasons in Ptujska Gora around 1400, who came directly from the St. Vitus masons' lodge in Prague.

Kutal carried out an extensive comparative study and came to the conclusion that the sculptor who made the Sternberg Madonna came from the Parler masons' lodge and was familiar with older Bohemian woodcuts and paintings. Around the year 1390 he created the Düsseldorf Madonna as the initial type for a group of Madonnas which included the Sternberg Madonna, and before 1400 he also made the Toruń Madonna. He likewise adopted elements that are typical of the circle of the Master of the Krumlov Madonna. The ways in which the sculptors responsible for the two types of Beautiful Madonnas influenced each other are so significant that it can be assumed that they both worked in the same workshop at the same time. It is probable that the Madonna in St Vitus’ Cathedral with a frame decorated by woodcuts was also made there. The dating of these works corresponds to the period when the “Junkers of Prague” (the sons of Peter Parler) were active in Prague.

== The origin of the statue ==
The older literature assumes that the sculpture was made for the monastery church of the Augustinians in Šternberk and then, during Baroque adaptations, was moved from there to the sacristy of the church in Babice. In the view of Ivo Hlobil, later alterations to the statue, in particular the trimming down of the rear of the originally fully three-dimensional sculpture and the lack of polychrome on the reverse side, may indicate an intermediary location (before it came to Babice) in the chapel in Sternberg Castle. The castle was built in 1380 by Albert of Sternberg, who was Bishop of Litomyšl and Magdeburg during the reign of Charles IV. In the chapel are winged altarpieces, with the style of the painting similar to that of the Master of the Třeboň Altarpiece, mural paintings from the period around 1380, and also a stone corbel, different in style from the corbel on the opposite wall of the chapel and not inserted into the wall until around the year 1400. The stone corbel is decorated by a relief figure of a stonemason. At that time the castle was owned by Albrecht of Sternberg, Bishop of Olomouc, Archbishop of Magdeburg, and the founder of the Augustinian monastery in Sternberg. The figure of the stonemason would appear to come from the Beautiful Style period, and stylistically it is so similar to the Sternberg Madonna that it might be the work of the same sculptor. An experiment was carried out, placing a plaster cast of the Madonna on the corbel, and it showed that the Madonna’s plinth corresponds to a section cut out of the corbel, and that the height and depth of the shrine under the canopy roughly correspond to the altered dimensions of the statue after the back and crown had been trimmed down.

== Restoration ==
The first restoration of the statue was carried out by František Sysel in 1958. In the process, six later layers of flesh colour polychrome and 4–5 later layers of polychrome on the undergarment, the mantle, and the veil were all removed, leaving just the oldest layers – vermilion on the upper side of the mantle, cobalt blue on the underside, gilding on the hem, dark red on the undergarment, and ochre on the veil. The original flesh colour in an eighth layer was not discovered until a further restoration was carried out in 1998. The restorer believes that the oldest layers of polychrome are on the flesh colour, the wimple, and the gilded areas (the hair, the crown, and the hems of the mantle), that only a chalk-glue ground was applied to the other surfaces, and that painting work was interrupted when the reverse side of the statue was trimmed down. The specific rich vermilion colour of the mantle, which distinguishes the Sternberg Madonna from other Beautiful Style Madonnas, may thus come from a later period, and various art historians have dated it to the 15th or 16th centuries.

Minor damage to the hem of the mantle was in the past repaired by re-carving, and the arrangement of the drapery is therefore in places lacking in logic. Also from a later period is the hole on the top of the head of the Infant Jesus, into which a halo was to be inserted. At an unknown date, the stone crown on the head of the Madonna was shortened and adapted so that a metal crown could be placed on it. The reverse side of the statue, originally intended to be in an open space, was fully three-dimensional, with a fan-shaped arrangement of the folds in the mantle from the shoulders down to the plinth, but not long after completion it was trimmed down, probably in connection with being re-positioned on a corbel. In the 1960s, as a result of poor workmanship when making a cast, the polychrome and chalk ground were damaged in several places.

=== Exhibitions ===
- 1966 Les Primitifs de Bohême, L'art gothique en Tchécoslovaquie 1350–1420, Brussels, Rotterdam
- 1970 scheduled for the exhibition of Czech gotic art in Paris. Exhibition was cancelled after Warsaw Pact invasion of Czechoslovakia
- 1978 Die Parler und der Schöne Stil, Schnütgen Museum, Cologne
- 1999 Od gotiky k renesanci. Výtvarná kultura Moravy a Slezska 1400–1550, Muzeum umění Olomouc
- 2000 Ultimi fiori del medioevo – dal gotico al rinascimento in Moravia e nella Slesia, Palazzo di Venezia, Rome
- 2005 Prague – The Crown of Bohemia, Metropolitan Museum of Art, New York City
- 2006 Karel IV., císař z Boží milosti. Kultura a umění za vlády Lucemburků 1310–1437, Riding school of the Prague Castle
- 2006 Slezsko, perla v české koruně. Tři období rozkvětu vzájemných uměleckých vztahů, Wallenstein riding hall, National Gallery in Prague
- 2014 Convent of Saint Agnes, National Gallery in Prague
- permanent exposition, Archdiocesan Museum, Olomouc

=== Related works ===
- Beautiful Madonna of Toruń, missing since 1945
- Piękna Madonna z Wrocławia, National Museum, Warsaw
- Madonna from Horažďovice, Bayerisches Nationalmuseum, Munich
- Madonna from Venice, Kunstmuseum Düsseldorf
- Madonaa from Bonn, Rheinisches Landesmuseum Bonn
- Madonna from Museum of Fine Arts in Budapest, purchased from the private collection in Amiens
- St Barbara, South portal, Cologne Cathedral
- St Barbara, Ptuj, Slovenia

== Sources ==
- Ivo Hlobil, Šternberská madona, krásná socha krásného slohu, Šternberk 2007, ISBN 978-80-254-1414-9
- Jiří Fajt, Robert Suckale, Madona ze Šternberka, in Jiří Fajt (ed.) Karel IV., císař z Boží milosti. Kultura a umění za vlády Lucemburků 1310–1437, Praha 2006, p. 549
- Ivo Hlobil, Šternberská madona, in: Vít Vlnas, Andrzej Niedzielenko (eds.), Slezsko, perla v české koruně, Praha 2006, s. 57, 59
- Jana Hrbáčová, Šternberská madona, in: Gabriela Elbelová, Pavel Zatloukal (red.), Arcidiecézní muzeum Olomouc, průvodce. Olomouc 2006, s. 77, kat. č. 79
- Ivo Hlobil, Šternberská madona, in: Ivo Hlobil, Marek Perůtka (eds.), Od gotiky k renesanci. Výtvarná kultura Moravy a Slezska 1400–1550. Díl 3. Olomoucko, Moravská galerie v Brně – Muzeum umění Olomouc, 1999, ISBN 80-85227-34-7
- Lothar Schultes, Prag und Wien um 1400. Plastik und Malerei, in: Gotik. Prag um 1400. Der Schöne Still. Böhmische Malerei un Plastik. Sonderausstellung der stadt Wien in Zusammenarbeit mit der Nationalgalerie Prag, Wien 1990
- Albert Kutal, Madona ve Šternberku a její mistr, Umění 6, 1958, s. 111-150
