= Death of the Virgin Mary of Košátky =

14th-century Bohemian painting

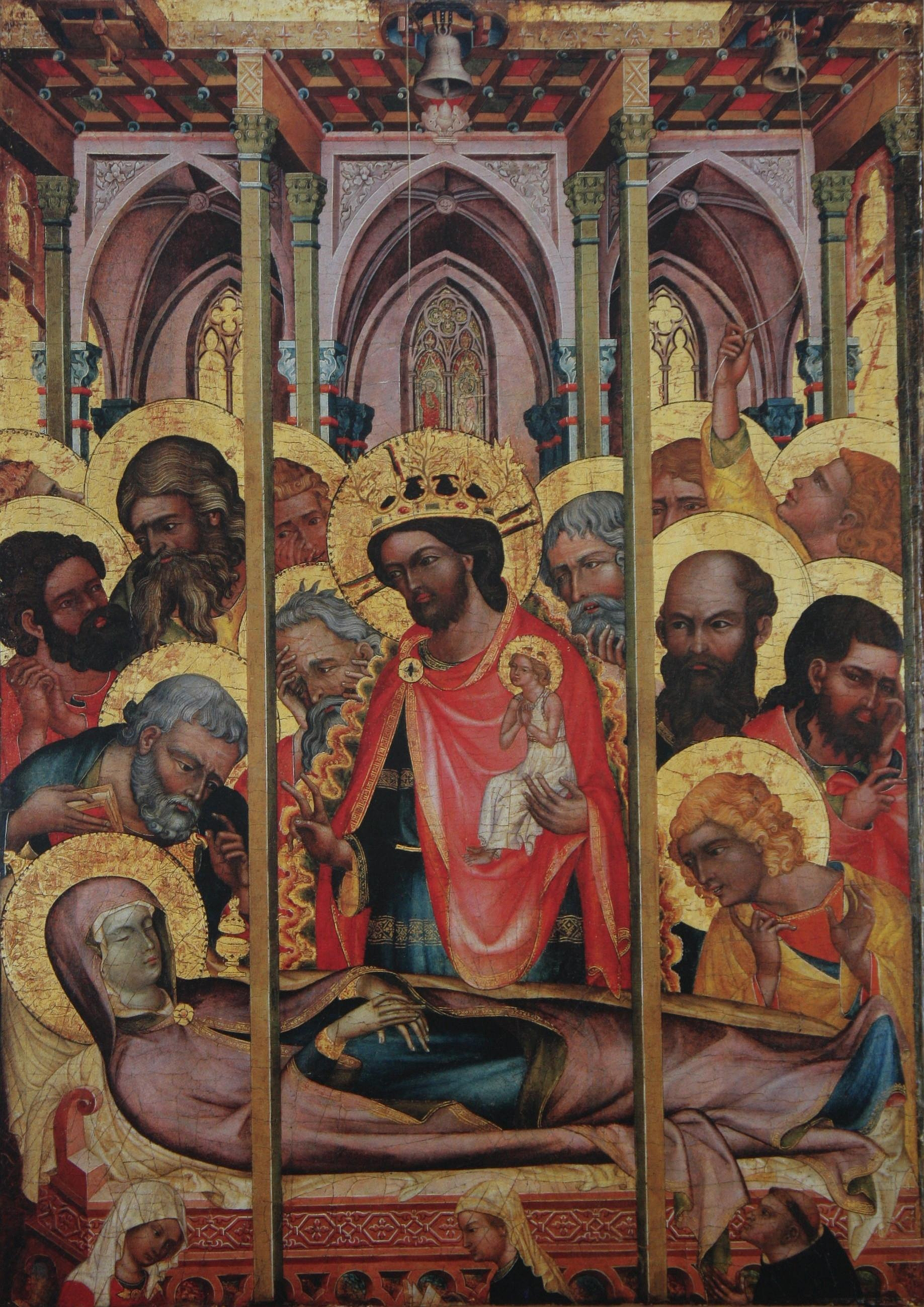
Dormition of the Virgin from Košátky

The Death of the Virgin Mary of Košátky is a Bohemian panel painting from the period around 1340–1350.

== History of the painting ==
The picture was discovered in 1922 in the Chapel of the Black Madonna at Košátky Castle near Mladá Boleslav and loaned to the Gallery of the Society of Patriotic Friends of Art. It originally belonged to the Krabice of Veitmile family that purchased Košátky fortress in 1420, and its actual owner was in all likelihood Beneš Krabice of Veitmile (Benesch von Weitmühl), the chronicler and director of the construction of St Vitus Cathedral. From this family, the picture came into the Kolowrat family through marriage. The Kolowrats owned it until 1946. The picture is now in the Museum of Fine Arts, Boston.

== Description and context ==
The picture is painted in tempera on an oak panel covered with stretched canvas. A preparatory drawing is etched into the chalk base and its contours outlined in black.

The work is a highly advanced example of the Gothic style, combining elements of Northern European Gothic and the strong influence of Italian, more specifically Sienese painting. It was painted by an unknown master during the reign of Charles IV and belongs to the broader circle of paintings executed in a similar way, such as the Vyšší Brod Altarpiece, the Kaufmann Crucifixion and the panels of the Morgan Collection (the Small Morgan Panels). The panel was probably originally the wing of a diptych, the second part of which was the Wrocław Holy Trinity.

In the quality of its execution, the picture ranks among the finest known works dating from the 14th century. It is at the same time the most Italian work of the entire Bohemian school. The construction of space reveals that the artist was acquainted with the central Italian painting of Siena (namely that of Simone Martini). Its composition is monumental and complex, while the facial type is derived from the Venetian school (namely Paolo di Venezia). A peculiar aspect of the work is the figure of Christ (holding the soul of Mary), who doesn’t ascend in a mandorla above the group but stands among the apostles. The mandorla is substituted by small stylised clouds around the figure.

The theme of depicting the death of the Virgin Mary itself is Byzantine in origin. In Bohemia, the oldest depiction of this kind (the Koímēsis) is a miniature on parchment inserted into the relic panels of a St George reliquary dating from 1306. Later works then gradually abandon the Byzantine scheme, replacing it with the motif of Last Prayer of the Virgin Mary. This was first recorded in the Czech lands from the 1360s.

== Sources ==
- Jitka Pazderová, Zobrazení Smrti Panny Marie v umění českého středověku, bakalářská práce, FF UP v Olomouci, 2014
- Jiří Fajt (ed.), Karel IV. Císař z boží milosti. Kultura an umění za vlády posledních Lucemburků 1347-1437: katalog výstavy, Pražský hrad 16. února - 21. května 2006, Praha 2006, pp. 84–85 (sest. Jiří Fajt, Robert Suckale).
- Mateusz Kapustka, Jan Klípa, Andrzej Kozieł, Piotr Oszczanowski, Śląsk - perła w Koronie Czeskiej. Trzy okresy świetności w relacjach artystycznych Śląska i Czech Katalog wystawy w Muzeum Miedzi w Legnicy i Národní galerie v Praze 2006-2007. Wrocław-Praha 2006
- Bożena Guldan-Klamecka, Anna Ziomecka, Sztuka na Śląsku XII – XVI w., Wrocław 2002
- Karel Stejskal, Umění na dvoře Karla IV, Artia Praha 1978
- Jaroslav Pešina, Česká gotická desková malba, Odeon, Praha 1976
- Albert Kutal, České gotické umění, Obelisk an Artia, Praha 1972
- Antonín Matějček, Jaroslav Pešina, Česká malba gotická, Melantrich, Praha 1950
