= Beautiful Madonna of Toruń =

Lost Gothic sculpture from Poland

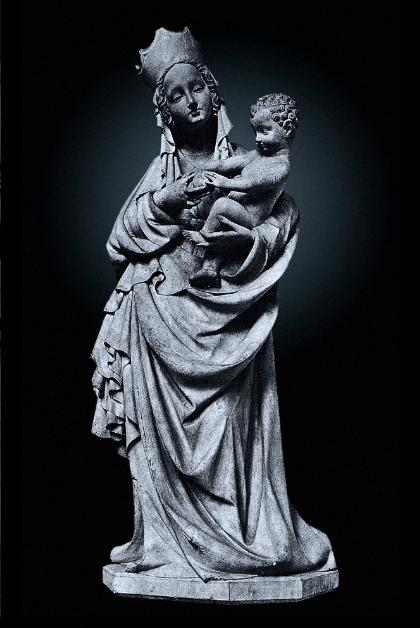
A photo of the original sculpture

The Beautiful Madonna from Toruń - a Gothic sculpture depicting Mary and Infant Jesus from Toruń. One of the most valuable, in terms of artistic value, images of the Madonna and Child made at the turn of the 14th and 15th century. In terms of typology and stylistics, this work is pars pro toto of a beautiful Madonna, an iconographic type shaped before 1400. The sculpted images of Beautiful Madonnas represent the Beautiful style, a stylistic trend shaped during the Gothic period in Central Europe.

Before World War II, the sculpture of the Beautiful Madonna was located in the church of St. John, the former parish church of the Old Town, now a cathedral of the Diocese of Toruń. At the end of the war it was stolen and removed by the Germans - the trace was ultimately lost. Only the original console with the bust of Moses, which was the basis for the statue, has been preserved to this day. A faithful copy made in 1956 by Witold Marciniak was put in place of the lost sculpture of Mary and the Child.

== History ==
Located in the southern part of the Teutonic Knights' state, Toruń became a great artistic centre in the 14th century. The patronage over the art was taken by the growing bourgeois class, which commissioned an unknown artist, described in literature as the Master of the Beautiful Madonna of Toruń, to create a monumental statue of the Mother and Child around 1390 probably for the Franciscan Church of the Blessed Virgin Mary in the Old Town. It was moved to the church of St. Johns at an unknown date.

The beautiful Madonna was first mentioned in the sources in 1650, again in 1667-1672 as part of the visit of Bishop Andrzej Olszowski of Chełmno. Canon Strzesz mentions the Beautiful Madonna as a part of a larger altar retable placed at the eastern wall of the northern nave where today a copy of the Madonna is located on the original console with Moses.

In 1921, Jan Rutkowski subjected the sculpture to conservation procedures, removing subsequent repainting, but leaving traces of medieval polychromy. In 1942, German conservators renovated the sculpture again, filling in the cavities, and two years later the statue was removed from the console and deposited in the conservation depot in Grębocin. Fearing the approaching Red Army, the statue was taken from the depot to an unknown location, most probably deep into Germany. In 1956, a Toruń sculptor Witold Marciniak made a faithful reconstruction of the lost work, then placed it on the original console with Moses.

== Appearance ==
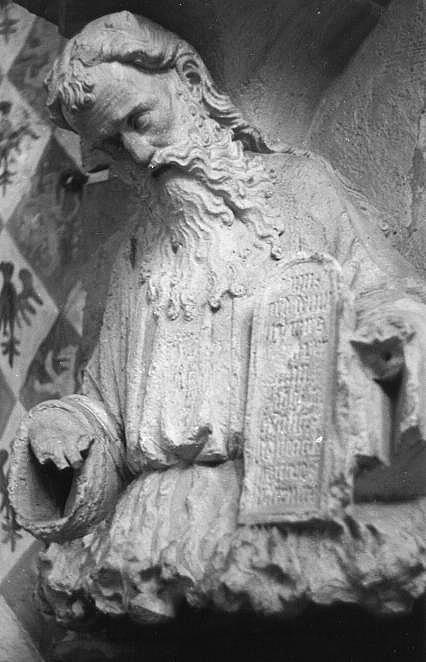
Bust of Moses - the console which is the basis of the figure of the Beautiful Madonna of Toruń

The Beautiful Madonna of Toruń is a fully sculpturally developed on each side figure with a height of 115 cm. Made of limestone, with traces of polychromy on the surface. Mary was depicted at a young age, her face is full of beauty, she has delicate features, high forehead, slightly closed eyes and small lips. Her hair is curly. Her head is covered with a veil with a crown on top. She supports herself on her right leg, while her left leg is slightly bent and a little forward. As a result, the head and body are bent in opposite directions. The body figure is very blurred. The gown and the coat are laid freely, as a result the figure is largely plasticized by means of generous draperies of robes. On the right side, the robes are characterized by quite strong parallel, curved bends, while on the left side, as in the veil, they take the form of decorative festoons with cascading folds. The child is naked and sits on the mother's right arm, its eyes are directed towards the apple, which it touches with its left hand. The artist shaped the body realistically according to the child's age. The thick, curly hair of the Baby is a free personal touch of the artist. There is a strong bond between Mary and young Jesus, emphasized by the tender, gentle gesture of Mary, who gives the Baby the fruit of the apple tree. The infant reciprocates with a similar gesture, touching the apple with his left hand as well as the right hand of the Mother. This relationship of gestures creates a strong accent on the composition based also on the smooth arrangement of the garment folds, Mary's contrasting pose and slightly inclined heads. Diagonal arrangements of both poses, gestures and draperies harmoniously emphasize the dynamics of the sculpture's composition. The base of the figure is an octagonal pedestal.

The sculpture of Mary and the Child stood on an ornamental console, made up of an almost full-fledged figure of Moses emerging from the flames of a burning bush. Unlike the figure of the Beautiful Madonna, the sculptor did not show Moses in full form. It is also not a bust, the sculpture reaches hip height. The prophet is portrayed as a person of a mature age, with his head firmly leaning down, with wrinkles on his cheeks and forehead, and eyebrow arches and orbits strongly highlighted. In contrast to the highly sophisticated figure of the Madonna, the figure of Moses was shaped more realistically, in a stylized way, the artist carved wavy strands of hair on the head, chin and cheeks. The sculpture shows numerous cavities, especially in the fingers of the hand, also lacks a second board with the text of the Decalogue.

== Analysis ==
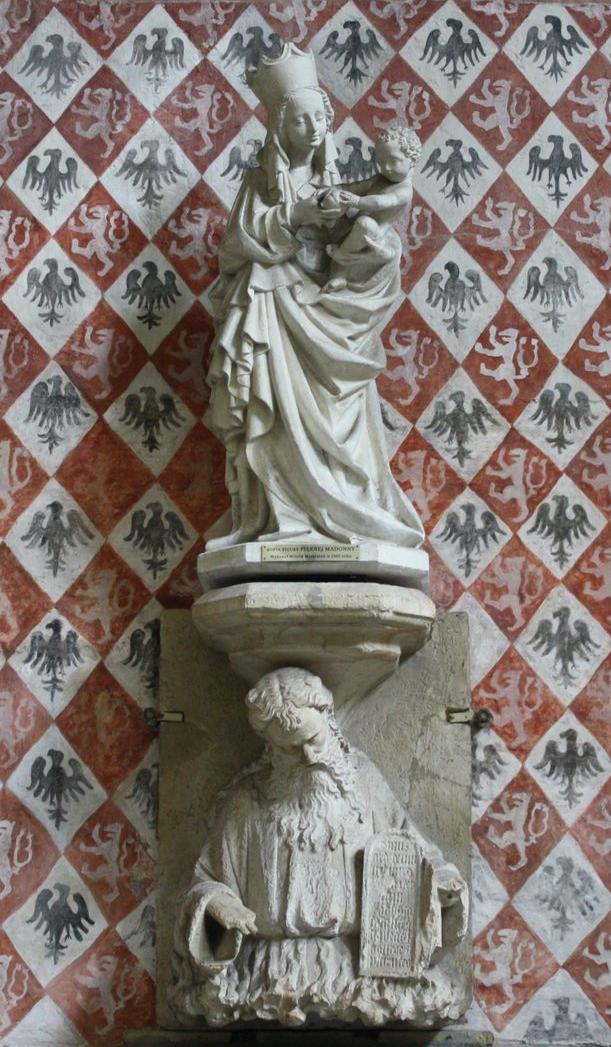
Reconstruction of the Beautiful Madonna and the original console with Moses

Toruń's Beautiful Madonna is considered to be the quintessence of the style around 1400, but the tradition of Gothic realism has also been preserved, including the art style of Parlers (a family of sculptors). The dynamic, fluid composition, far-reaching idealization of beauty and subtle decoration of the abundant draperies of the robes and the studio contrast of Mary's posture, soft modeling of the Infant's body, correct proportions, knowledge of anatomy, spatiality of individual elements of the body and attention to detail confirm this stylish synthesis.

The author of the figure, unknown by name, was once called by art historians the Master of Beautiful Madonnas or currently the Master of Beautiful Madonna of Toruń. His unknown career, as well as his oeuvre, origin and influence are the subject of many years of scientific discussions, although as a result of more recent research, the Master is credited, among others, with Praying Christ from the Church of St. John the Baptist in Malbork (currently in the collection of the local Castle Museum) and is associated with Pieta in the Church of St. Barbara in Krakow. However, the factors complicating the research on the work of the Toruń Master are the similarities of many other works in terms of composition, stylistics and ideological content, which were found in various places in Central Europe, hence the "international" character of art around 1400. The problem of the origin of the style of Toruń's work reflects to a large extent the unresolved issues of the sources of the beautiful style. The Czech Republic with Prague, Silesia with Wrocław, France with Paris, Austria with Salzburg and the Rhineland with Cologne are considered to be the main centres that were to shape the style around 1400. The court culture and the Parler's trend are important foundations for the beautiful style, these two tendencies have marked a large part of Europe. The Eastern Pomerania, which belonged to the Teutonic Knights' state, became an important artistic region around 1400, with the artistic centres in Gdansk, Torun, Elblag and the capital of the monastic state - Malbork. A number of works from around 1400 have been preserved in Toruń (including St. Mary Magdalene carried by angels from Toruń Cathedral), but each of them has its own characteristics, independent of the form of the Beautiful Madonna, with the exception of the Madonna of Good Hope (also known as the Pregnant Madonna) from Toruń City Hall, which went missing during the recent war. Researchers emphasize a strong link between the Beautiful Madonna of Toruń and the Beautiful Madonna of Wrocław, some of them associate both works with the same sculptor. Numerous similarities to the figure from Toruń can be observed in the Sternberg Madonna, or the statues of Mary and the Child in Bonn, as well as in Gdańsk (e.g. Pietà in the church of the Blessed Virgin Mary). Apart from Toruń, researchers point to Prague as the place of the creation of the Beautiful Madonna. Numerous stone sculptures were made in this city around 1400, including the Beautiful Madonna from Český Krumlov (currently in the collection of the Kunsthistorisches Museum in Vienna); however, according to most art historians, this figure has no direct workshop connection with sculptures from Wroclaw and Torun. The capital of the Czech Crown during the reign of the last Luxembourgers, mainly King Wenceslas IV (1378-1419), and his father Charles IV, belonged to the main art centres of Central Europe.

The beautiful Madonna from Toruń is also characterized by rich symbolism and ideological content. The extraordinary beauty of Mary is reflected in theology by the spiritual beauty of the Mother of God. Because of the fruit of the apple tree passed on to Christ, Mary becomes a New Eve and Jesus a New Adam. This gesture means the forgiveness of the sins of humanity and its forefather and foremother, who were the first to reach out and taste the fruit from the Tree of Knowledge against God's will. The naked body of the Child presented by Mary not only reflects the Savior's humanity, but is also associated with the Eucharist.

== Interesting facts ==
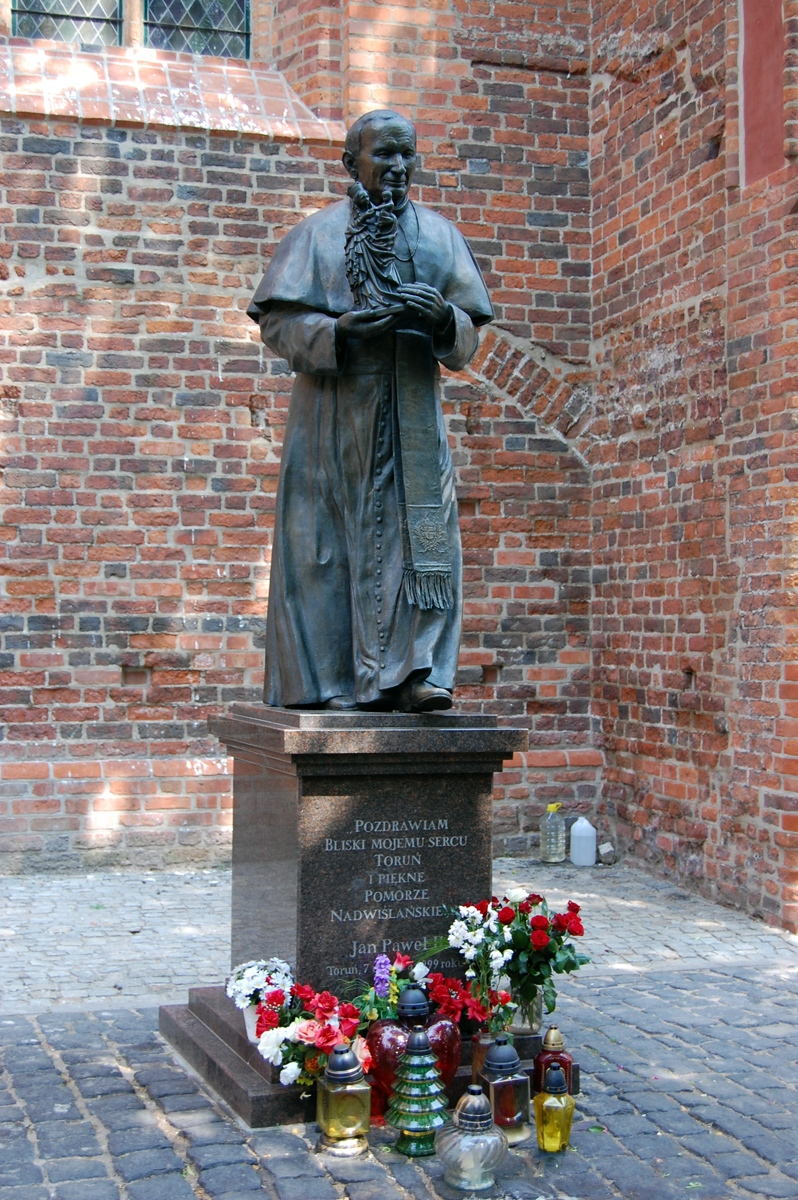
Monument to John Paul II at the Toruń Cathedral

The cult of the Beautiful Madonna of Toruń did not cease after the loss of the original figure. The figure has become an iconic symbol in the culture of Toruń and social awareness. During the service celebrated by John Paul II at the airport in Toruń as part of the 7th Apostolic Journey around Poland on June 7, 1999, Karol Wojtyła received a replica of the Beautiful Madonna made by Tadeusz Porębski. As part of the first anniversary of John Paul II's visit to the cathedral, a statue of the Pope made by Radosław Ociepa was unveiled. It is the oldest of the five monuments of John Paul II in Toruń. It shows the Pope presenting the statue of the Beautiful Madonna of Toruń in his hands. There is a contemporary replica of the Toruń sculpture in the Basilica of St John the Baptist in Chojnice.

== Sources ==
- Jan Białostocki, Sztuka cenniejsza niż złoto, Warszawa 2004.
- Anna Błażejewska, Katarzyna Kluczwajd, Dzieje sztuki Torunia, Toruń 2008.
- Carl Heinz Clasen, Der Meister der Schönen Madonnen. Herkunft, Entfaltung und Umkreis, Berlin-New York 1974.
- Tadeusz Dobrowolski, Sztuka polska, Kraków 1974.
- Lech Kalinowski, Sztuka około 1400. [in:] Sztuka około 1400. Materiały Sesji Stowarzyszenia Historyków Sztuki, Poznań, listopad 1995, Warszawa 1996.
- Monika Jakubek-Raczkowska, Rzeźba gdańska przełomu XIV i XV wieku, Warszawa 2006.
- Monika Jakubek-Raczkowska, Plastyka średniowieczna od XIII do XVI wieku, Katalog wystawy stałej, Muzeum Narodowe w Gdańsku, Gdańsk 2007.
- Monika Jakubek-Raczkowska, Uwagi o znaczeniu tzw. Pięknych Madonn w sztuce i religijności państwa zakonnego w Prusach, „Acta Universitatis Nicolai Copernici”, Zabytkoznawstwo i Konserwatorstwo XL, Toruń 2011, s. 39–94.
- Janusz Kębłowski, Polska sztuka gotycka, Warszawa 1983.
- Janina Kruszelnicka, Dawny ołtarz Pięknej Madonny Toruńskiej, „Teka Komisji Historii Sztuki”, IV, Toruń 1968, p. 5-85.
- Zygmunt Kruszelnicki, Piękne Madonny – problem otwarty, „Teka Komisji Historii Sztuki”, VIII, Toruń 1992, s. 31–105.
- Anton Legner (hrsg.), Die Parler und der Schöne Stil 1350-1400. Europäische Kunst unter den Luxemburgern, Köln 1978.
- Wojciech Marcinkowski, Co to jest Piękna Madonna?, [in:] Piotr Kapustka (red.), Prawda i twórczość, Wrocław 1998, p. 39-53.
- Wojciech Marcinkowski, Sztuka około roku 1400 – spór o pojęcia, [in:] Jerzy Gadomski (red.), Magistro et amico amici discipulique. Lechowi Kalinowskiemu w osiemdziesięciolecie urodzin, Kraków 2002, p. 51-62.
- Andrzej M. Olszewski, Niektóre zagadnienia stylu międzynarodowego w Polsce, [in:] Piotr Skubiszewski (red.) Sztuka i ideologia XV wieku. Materiały Sympozjum Komitetu Nauk o Sztuce PAN, Warszawa, 1–4 grudnia 1976, Warszawa 1976.
