= John of Neumarkt =

Czech politician (1310–1381)

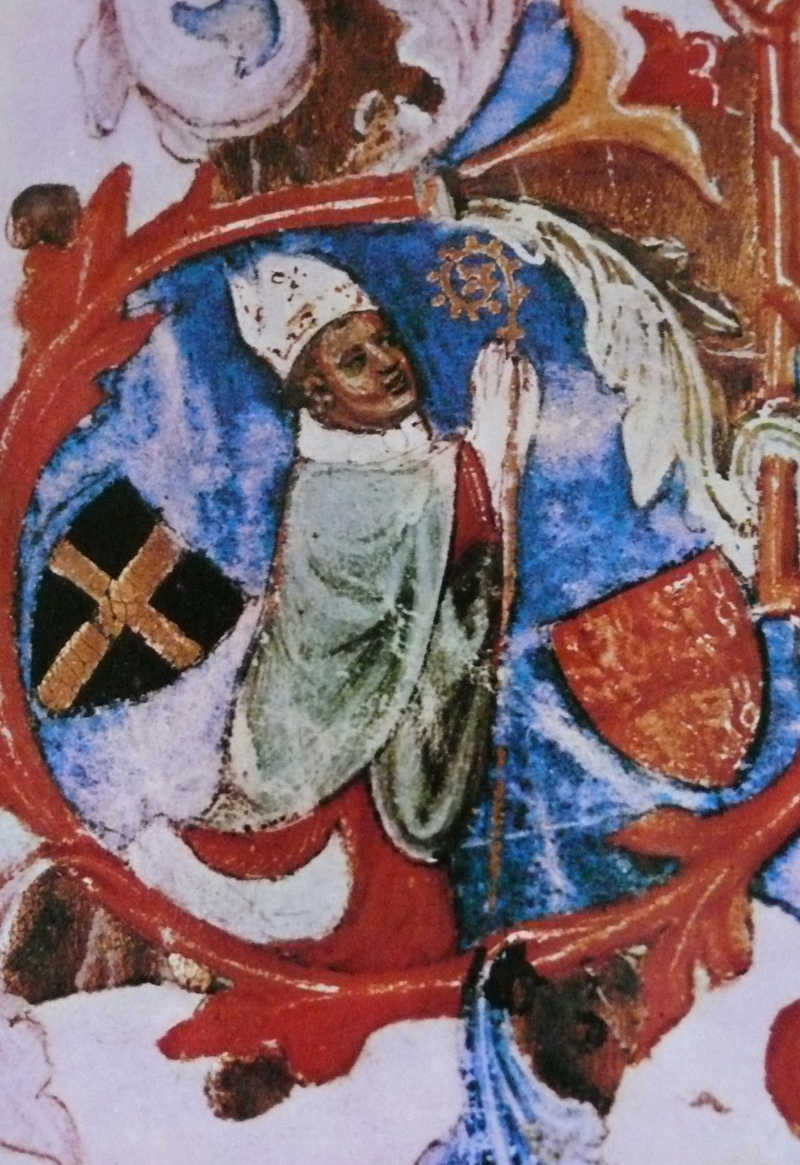
John of Neumarkt

John of Neumarkt also Johannes von Neumarkt (Latin: Ioannes de Novo Foro, Czech: Jan ze Středy; 1310 in Neumarkt – 24 December 1380 in Modřice, Moravia) was Chancellor of Emperor Charles IV, appointed Bishop of Naumburg, Bishop of Litomyšl, Bishop of Olomouc and elected Bishop of Wroclaw. He is also known for his early humanist works.

== Life ==
His parents, named Nicholas and Margaret, were bourgeois. His brother Mathias was a Cistercian monk and Auxiliary Bishop of Litomyšl and later of Wroclaw. An older sister was married to Rudolf Richter in Vysoké Mýto (German: Hohenmauth). Their son was Dean of the Charles University.

John probably studied in Italy. His sponsors were Nikolaus von Pannwitz, curator of the Wrocław Cathedral Chapter, and Wolfram von Pannwitz, Viscount of Glatz. For 1340 John is recorded as being a notary of Ziębice Duke Bolko II. Presumably as a sinecure, he received the parish of Neumarkt, which he was allowed to keep with the permission of the Wroclaw Bishop Preczlaw of Pogarell, even after he entered the service of the Bohemian Royal Chancery. In 1350 he received a canonry in Olomouc and in 1351 those in Breslau and Großglogau.

=== Appointed bishop of Naumburg ===
In 1352 the Naumburg cathedral chapter chose Rudolf von Nebra as the new bishop without the consent of Pope Clement VI. The pope reacted by appointing John, who, when he was raised to Bishop of Litomyšl, supported the Franciscans' Burchard Graf von Mansfeld as a rival candidate to Rudolf von Nebra. The conflict in Naumburg lasted until 1358 and was investigated by the Cardinal Guy de Boulogne.

=== Bishop of Litomyšl ===
On 9 October 1353 John was appointed bishop of Litomyšl. The ordination took place early 1354. Because he mostly stayed in Prague as court chancellor of Emperor Charles IV, he was represented in Litomyšl by the Official Nikolaus of Pelhřimov and by his brother Mathias, who served there as auxiliary bishop. At his own expense Johannes was in Leitomischl an Augustinian monastery building.

=== Bishop of Olomouc ===
With the support of Charles IV. John of Neumarkt was appointed on 28 August 1364 by Pope Urban V. Bishop of Olomouc, as the incumbent Jan Očko of Vlašim had risen to the Archbishop of Prague. A year later he received the title regalis capellae Bohemiae comes ("Count of the Bohemian royal chapel"), with which the honor and the right were bound, in the presence of other bishops – with the exception of the archbishop of Prague – to crown the King of Bohemia.

John stayed only rarely in Olomouc, and was represented by vicars general. There were the Brno Provost Nikolaus, Friedrich von Wolframskirchen and the Olomouc Provost Jakob von Kaplitz. In 1367 John confirmed the statutes of the chapter of Kroměříž and in 1371 the establishment of the Augustinian monastery in Šternberk by his friend Albrecht of Sternberg. He resided in his diocese only once he had fallen out of favour with the Emperor, where he stayed for his part to comply with the residence obligation of the clergy. In 1380 he held synod in Kroměříž where he ordered the celebration of the feast of Saints Cyril and Methodius and the Saints Christina and Cordula. Because of a property dispute, clashes occurred after the death of Emperor Charles in 1378 between John and the Moravian Margraves Jobst and Prokop. As a consequence of this, John and his chapter were forced to leave. The conflict could only be resolved in 1380 by the Prague archbishop Jan of Jenštejn.

=== Elected bishop of Wroclaw ===
Likely because of the Olomouc disputes Johannes aimed in 1380 for a transfer from Olomouc to his home diocese of Wroclaw. Already after the death of the Wroclaw Bishop Preczlaw of Pogarell in 1376 John of Neumarkt was the preferred candidate of the Emperor Charles IV and Pope Gregory XI. However, the cathedral chapter chose the dean Dietrich of Klatovy, who was in 1378 confirmed in this office by the Avignon Pope Clement VII. In a repeat ballot in 1380 John of Neumarkt was elected as the Bishop of Breslau, but died before the papal confirmation would have reached him.

=== In imperial service ===
Johannes von Neumarkt held the office of a notary of the Bohemian King John of Luxembourg and was from 1351 recorded as chancellor of the Bohemian queen Anna. 1352 he was appointed prothonotary and named as the successor of Jan Očko of Vlašim as chancellor of Emperor Charles IV. In this position he was in February 1354 in Metz and in the autumn in France. 1355 he accompanied Charles IV to the imperial coronation in Rome and traveled to Nuremberg at Christmas, where he participated in the Reichstag and was in attendance at the court day at the announcement of the Golden Bull on 10 January 1356. In 1356 he was again in Metz, 1357 in Aachen and Vienna, in 1359 in Wroclaw. 1364 he took part in the negotiations between the Emperor Charles IV. and the Habsburgs.

In 1373 John lost, for now unknown reasons, the favor of the Emperor and lost the chancellorship. Afterwards, he went to his diocese of Olomouc. Citing twenty-six years of loyal service he tried in vain to regain his former position.

== Humanist and writer ==
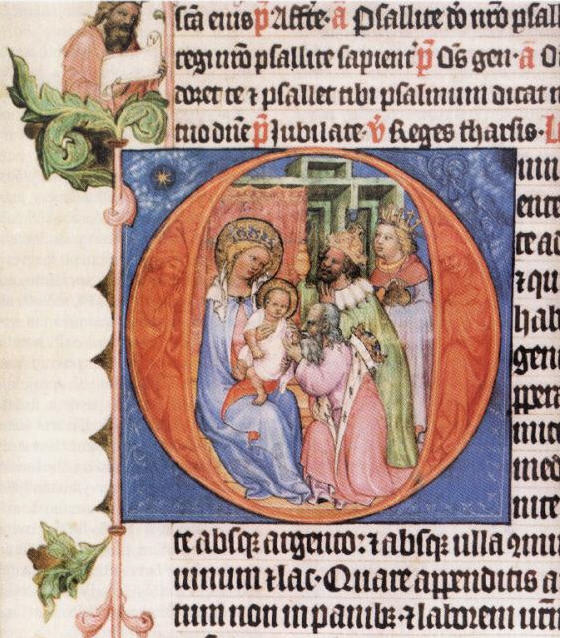
Detail of the "Liber viaticus" – Adoration of the Magi

John of Neumarkt had an excellent education. He was an early proponent of Bohemian humanism. In his surroundings, the first circle of humanists of the north of the Alps was cultivated. Since 1350 he knew Cola di Rienzo and, since 1354 Francesco Petrarca, with whom he corresponded extensively.

Because of his literary career he worked with several writers in his cities of Mürau, Kremsier and Mödritz. In the imperial chancery, he introduced a new writing style, which was used for quotations from Latin classics and the Church Fathers. He wrote formularies in the best Latin and sample collections for letters, documents and other documents and translated himself the "Soliloquia" into German. Towards the end of the 1350s he made his travel-breviary "Liber viaticus", which is known as a masterpiece of Bohemian book-illustration. These illustrations are among the best of that time. German and Latin poems and prayers have also been influenced by him. In 1356 he bequeathed his books to the Augustinian monastery of St. Thomas in Prague.

John maintained an orchestra, designed for secular celebrations, and strove for good education in schools. He cared greatly about the liturgy, which he unified in 1376 for the entire diocese.

John of Neumarkt was long regarded as identical with John of Hohenmauth. Recent research, however, assumes two different persons.

=== Works ===
- Cancellaria Joannis Noviforensis episcopi Olomucensis
- Summa cancellariae Caroli IV.
- Collectarius perpetuarum formarum
- Rubrica ecclesiae Olomucensis iuxta consuetudinem antiquam
- Buch der Liebkosung
- Das Leben des heiligen Hieronymus

== Literature ==
- Hans Jürgen Rieckenberg (1974). "Johann von Neumarkt". Neue Deutsche Biographie (in German). Vol. 10. Berlin: Duncker & Humblot. pp. 563–564. (full text online).
- Alfons Huber (1881). "Johann von Neumarkt" . Allgemeine Deutsche Biographie (in German). Vol. 14. Leipzig: Duncker & Humblot. pp. 468–469.
- Jan Bistřický: Johann von Neumarkt (um 1310–1380). In: Erwin Gatz: Die Bischöfe des Heiligen Römischen Reiches 1198 bis 1448., ISBN 3-428-10303-3, S. 512–513
- Roland Böhm (1992). "Johann von Neumarkt". In Bautz, Friedrich Wilhelm (ed.). Biographisch-Bibliographisches Kirchenlexikon (BBKL) (in German). Vol. 3. Herzberg: Bautz. cols. 165–168. ISBN 3-88309-035-2.
