= Holy Trinity of Wrocław =

Bohemian panel painting

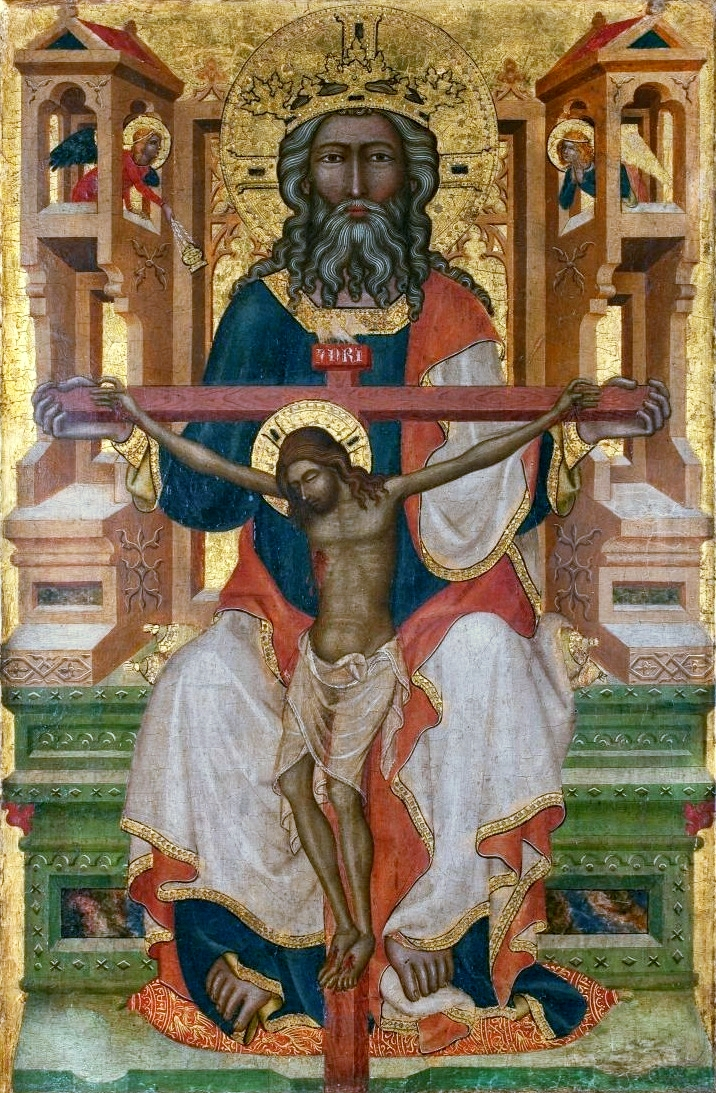
Wrocław Holy Trinity, National Museum in Wrocław

The Holy Trinity of Wrocław (Polish: Trójca Święta ze Świerzawy or Tron Łaski ze Świerzawy) is a Bohemian panel painting dating from the period around 1350.

== History of the painting ==
The picture was discovered in 1898 in the loft of the Church of SS John the Baptist and Catherine of Alexandria in Świerzawa, Lower Silesia, and given to the diocesan museum in Wrocław. In 1904 it was restored in Berlin. After 1945 it was in the state art collection at the Wawel in Kraków, then in 1964 it was transferred to the then Wrocław Silesian Regional Museum. It is now in the collection of the National Museum in Wrocław.

== Description and context ==
The picture is painted in tempera on an oak panel covered with stretched canvas. A drawing is etched into the chalk base and its contours outlined in black. The picture is characterised by a symmetrical composition, simplified perspective-based projection and precise drawing.

The panel in all likelihood formed part of a diptych along with the Death of the Virgin Mary of Košátky by the same artist. It belongs to the circle of the workshop of the Master of the Vyšší Brod Altarpiece. Its Bohemian origin is demonstrated by a number of features in the drawing details that correspond with other works. These include the similarity of the throne, ornaments and cushion with the Madonna of Kłodzko and the similarity of the composition, figural types, modelling and painting technique with the Death of the Virgin Mary of Košátky.
