= Liber viaticus =

Coordinates: 50.0799°N 14.4321°E

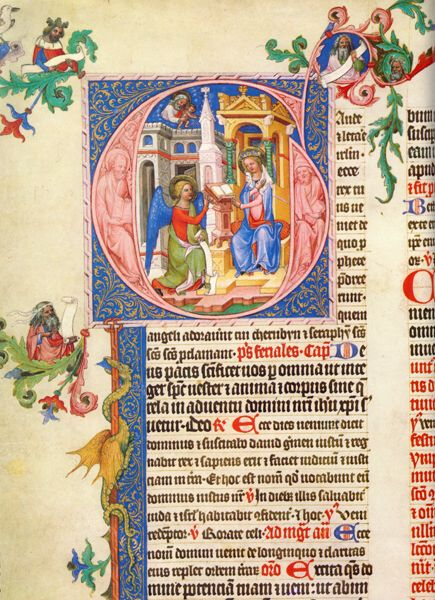
- Zvestovani
- Publication date: 1360s
- Media type: ink and gouache on parchment
- Pages: 319
- National Museum Library, Prague

Liber viaticus is a breviary made sometime in the 1350s, at the latest in 1364, for Bishop John of Neumarkt. This is an illuminated manuscript of 319 sheets in relatively good condition preserved to this day (not the original binding) and deposited in the National Museum Library, Prague (sign. XIII A 12).

== Analysis ==
The title Liber viaticus comes directly from the book itself, which in a sort of bookplates is the text "Liber viaticus Domini Johannis, Luthomislensis Episcopi, imperialis cancellarii", which can be translated as "travel book of Mr. John, bishop of Litomysl, superior office". The Codex could therefore serve as a traveling breviary, albeit rather expensive to manufacture at least it raises doubts that he routinely traveled with the book.

The book is especially known for its rich illuminations. The artist (anonymous, in literature known as the Master Liber viaticus), who was well educated; he was familiar with both the Italian and French painting tradition. The Painting concerns several large figure scenes in initials, minor abstract initials, and Drolleries.

== Bibliography ==
- Jiří Fajt. Mistr Liber viaticus, Liber viaticus Jana ze Středy (č. kat. 14), in: FAJT, Jiří, ed. Karel IV., císař z Boží milosti: kultura a umění za vlády Lucemburků 1310–1437. Vyd. 1. Praha: Academia, 2006. ISBN 80-200-1399-7, s. 96–98.
