= Jiří Fajt =

Czech art historian

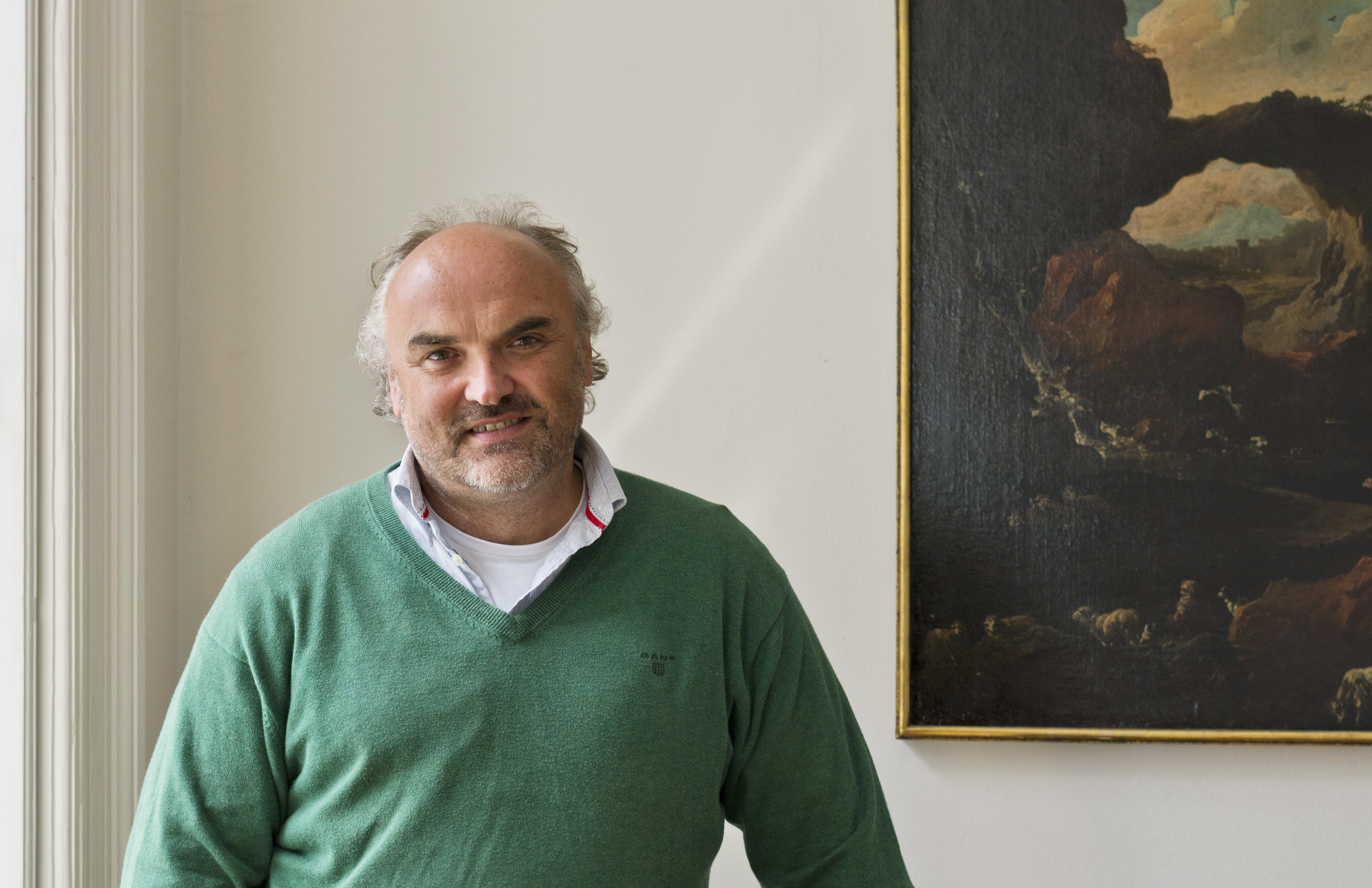
Jiří Fajt

Jiří Fajt (born 11 May 1960 in Prague) is a Czech art historian living in Berlin and in Prague. From July 2014 to April 2019 he served as a Director General of the National Gallery in Prague. He is particularly interested in mediaeval and early modern arts of Central and Central-Eastern Europe. He is the author of a number of publications and successful international exhibitions.

== Life ==
Fajt was born in Prague on 11 May 1960. In 1983 he graduated from the Czech University of Life Sciences Prague and for a few subsequent years (1984–88) he made his living as a window cleaner in the Prague firm Úklid. In 1987 he started reading art history as an extramural student of the Faculty of Philosophy of Charles University in Prague. A year later he started working as a curator of the Collection of Czech Stone Sculpture of the 11th–19th centuries in the Lapidarium of the National Museum in Prague. In 1992 he became a curator of the collection of mediaeval art of the National Gallery in Prague and two years later, he won the competition for the post of the head of the Collection of the Old Masters. In 1999 he obtained a doctorate in art history at Charles University in Prague. Between 1998 and 2001 he also worked as a founding director of the Centre for Medieval Art at the National Gallery in Prague (financed by the VW Stiftung). In 2000 he left the National Gallery in Prague of his own accord, as an expression of disapproval of the then head of the NG, Milan Knížák and since then, worked in Germany where he also subsequently moved with his family.

In the first half of the first decade of this century he supervised an internationally staffed scholarly research project entitled, The Jagiello Dynasty of Europe. Art and Culture in Central Europe 1450–1550 in the Geisteswissenschaftliches Zentrum Geschichte und Kultur Ostmitteleuropas at the University of Leipzig (GWZO), financed by the Deutsche Forschungsgemeinschaft in Bonn (with Robert Suckale). In the same institute, he headed a scholarly research project in the second half of the same decade, entitled Court Culture in Central-Eastern Europe from the 14th to the 18th Centuries. Comparative Study of Cultural Communication and Presentation, between 2011 and 2013 he was at the head of the scholarly research project, Presentation and memoria of the Late Medieval Monarchs in Central Europe: Art – Liturgy – History, 1250–1550 and from 2014 he has been in charge of the project entitled Courts of High Clergy and Magnates – Spiritual and Secular Princes at Rulers‘ Courts: Independence – Dependence – Relations, both financed by the Bundesministerium für Bildung und Forschung v Bonnu. At the Research Institute in Leipzig, he initiated the start of a publication series entitled Studia Jagellonica Lipsiensia (by 2015, 18 volumes had been published, Thorbecke Verlag Ostfildern) and of the critical edition, Kompass Ostmitteleuropa (by 2015, two volumes were published, Thorbecke Verlag Ostfildern), he is also in charge of the concept of the publication of the nine-volume Handbook of the Art History of Central-Eastern Europe (Handbuch zur Geschichte der Kunst in Ostmitteleuropa, first volume 2015/16, Deutscher Kunstverlag Berlin-München), he is the head of the projects of important international exhibitions and initiator of the infrastructure project of the digital internet platform, Monuments of Central-Eastern Europe (in collaboration with the Herder-Institut (Marburg) and Bildarchiv Foto Marburg, financed by Leibniz-Gemeinschaft).

From 2001 he worked as a visiting professor at Technische Universität Berlin where in 2009 he habilitated with a publication, Der Nürnberger Maler Sebald Weinschröter im Netzwerk von Kaiserhof und Patriziat (1349–1365/70) (in 2009, he thus obtained in the field of art history the degree of Dr. habil., from 2011 he was a private senior lecturer – PD Dr.). Apart from that, he lectured at Humboldt University in Berlin and at Charles University in Prague. In 2012 he also habilitated at the Faculty of Arts, Charles University in Prague, presenting his publication Der lange Schatten Karls IV. Zur Rezeption der luxemburgischen Herrschaftsrepräsentation im Heiligen Römischen Reich. (2012 – Doc.)

In 2010 he unequivocally succeeded before an international commission in the selection procedure for the post of the Director General of the National Gallery in Prague; on July 4, 2013 he was appointed Director General of the National Gallery in Prague, taking up the position on July 1, 2014.
