= Madonna of Michle =

The Michle Madonna is the work of an unknown sculptor called the "Master of the Michle Madonna" who probably worked in Brno or Prague during the second third of the 14th century. The name of the sculpture, brought from Brno in 1856, relates to its non-original location in the parish church in Michle from where it was purchased by the National Gallery in Prague.

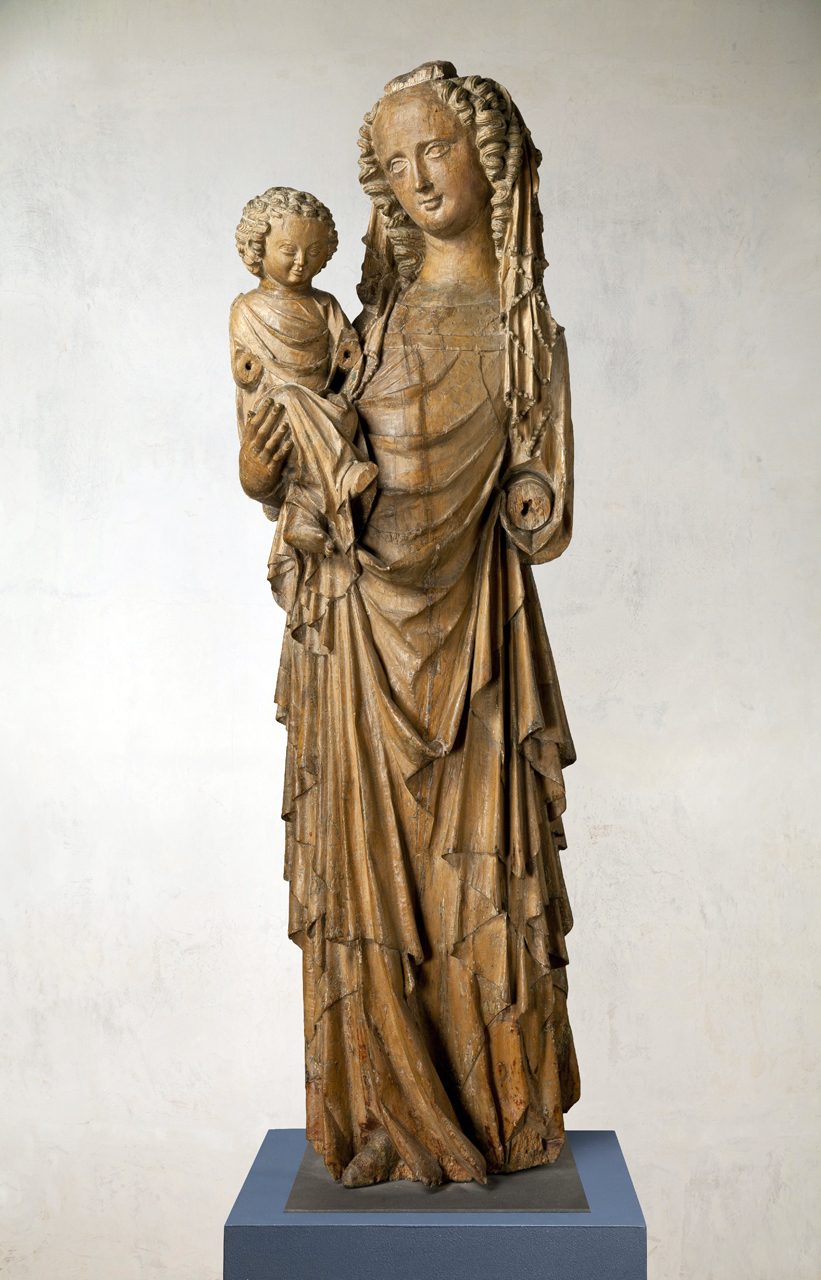
Michle Madonna, National Gallery in Prague

== Description and context ==
The sculpture of the Michle Madonna is 120 cm tall and is carved from pear wood. It bears traces of polychromy. It is the most important example of the linear-rhythmic style of carving, dating from the second quarter of the 14th century in the Czech lands. This style is characterised by drapery that clings to a cylindrical torso in low, sagging pleats that have a decorative and finely drawn character, as does the linen cloth and locks of hair. The legs of the figure of the Madonna in contrapose are clearly distinguished between the standing and loose one. The child is resting on the Madonna's jutting right side, towards which both the vertical and horizontal folds of the clothes converge, thus emphasising the bond between the mother and child. The lower position of the child enables the mother's head to bow more, thereby making the sculptural composition more enclosed. The Infant Jesus’s hands have not survived but it is clear that he is making a blessing, and is thus not turned towards his mother but towards the faithful.

The Michle Madonna’s formal conception has much in common with the linear style of French stone sculpture of the first third of the 14th century (such as the sculpture of five apostles from the Church of St Jacques-aux-Pèlerins and the tomb sculptures of French kings at St Denis) that could have been mediated to the Czech context through the Rhineland. Sculptures of this style are typified by stylisation of shapes and a dense schematic linear pleating of the drapery in both standing and reclining figures. The objective details and wealth of decoration, precisely observed and reproduced, are striking. The group of wooden sculptures related to the Michle Madonna were also originally covered with polychromy, gilding and embossing.

The distinct abstracting style of the workshop of the "Master of the Michle Madonna" gradually absorbed the impulses of contemporary panel painting that was oriented more towards Italian models – the head of the Michle Madonna bears a striking resemblance to the "Madonna of Veveří". It was characterised by a greater emphasis on the physical volume of the figures and the realistic depiction of details. The workshop also produced other Moravian Madonnas (such as the "Madonna of Velké Meziříčí", the small "Apostle of Veverská Bitýška", the "Znojmo Madonna" and the "Prostějov Madonna"). Late works ascribed to the workshop of the "Master of the Michle Madonna" prefigured the abandoning of linear formalism that was accompanied by the effort to achieve specific form and greater naturalism.
