= Master of the Pähl Altarpiece =

Anonymous 14th/15th-century German painter

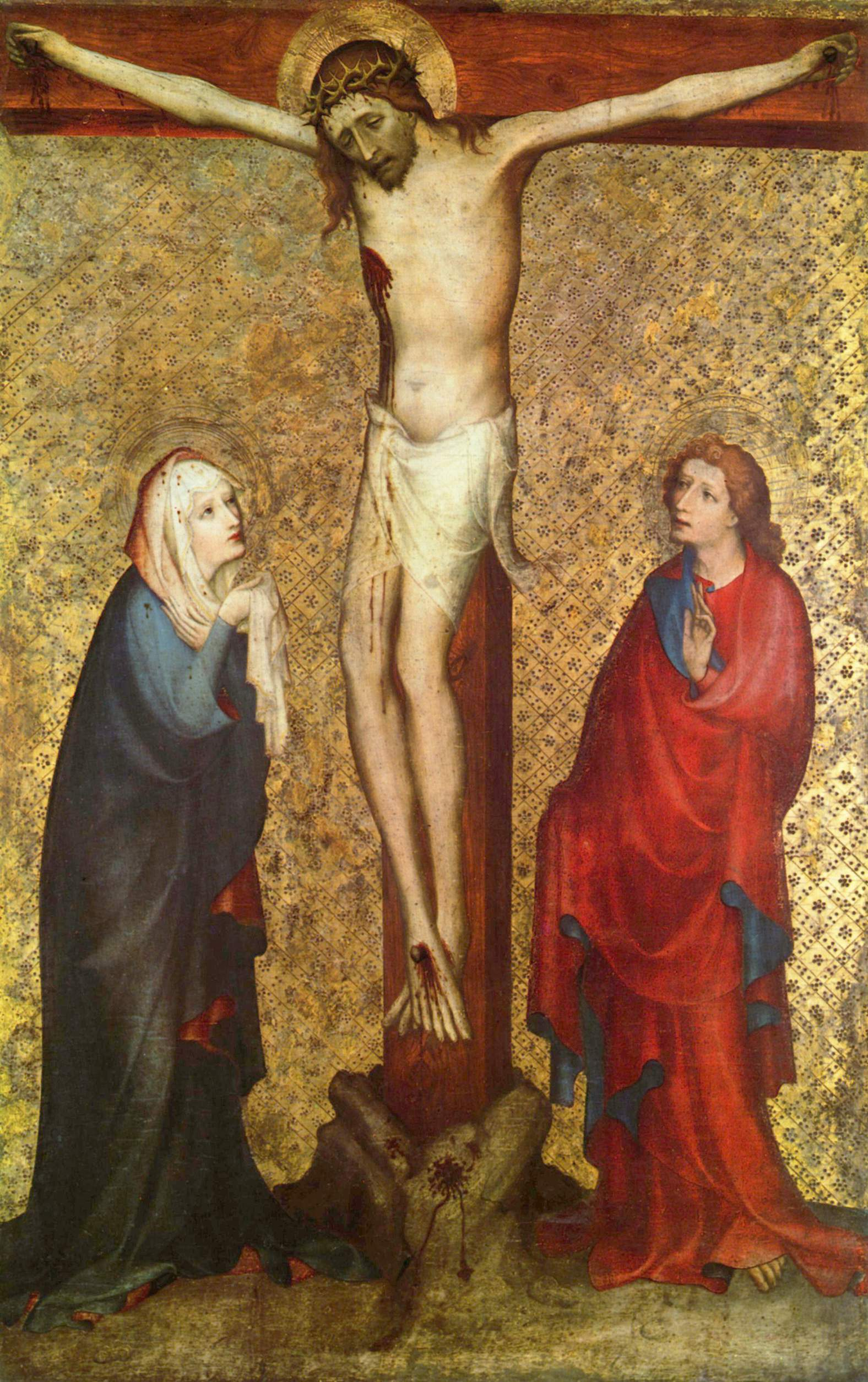
Master of the Pähl Altarpiece: Crucifixion of Christ

The Master of the Pähl Altarpiece (German: Meister des Pähler Altars) was an anonymous Gothic painter, known for the winged altar or triptych he painted for Schloss Pähl in Pähl in the Weilheim-Schongau district of Bavaria at the end of the 14th century. The triptych is now in the Bavarian National Museum.

The Master of the Pähl Altar shows a style of painting influenced by Bohemian masters such as the Master of the Wittingau Altarpiece.
