= St. Vitus Madonna =

15th-century painting

Madonna of St. Vitus
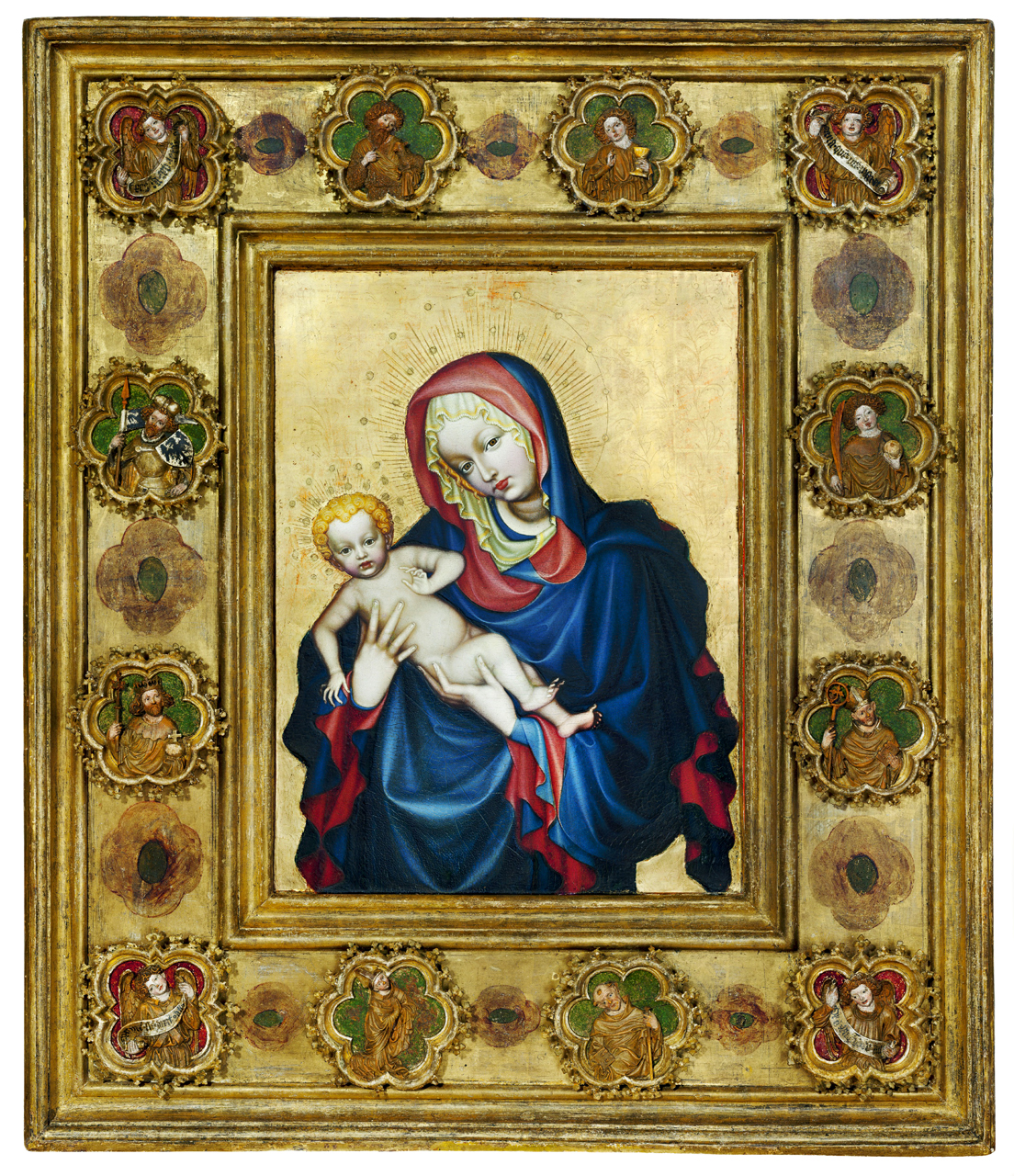
- Artist: Prague Junkers ?
- Year: (c. 1395-1415)
- Medium: tempera on a chalk ground, on a softwood panel covered with linen
- Dimensions: 51 cm × 39,5 cm (20 in × 156 in)
- Location: National Gallery, Prague

The St. Vitus Madonna (c. 1395–1415) comes from the treasure of St. Vitus Cathedral in Prague and is exhibited in its original frame in the permanent collection of the National Gallery in Prague.

== History of the picture ==
Jan of Jenštejn, chancellor of King Wenceslaus IV and the Archbishop of Prague, was usually quoted as the donor of this picture. It is more likely, however, that the picture was painted later on, meaning that a more probable donor was Oldřich Zajíc of Hazmburk, brother of Zbyněk Zajíc of Hazmburk, fifth Archbishop of Prague, who died in 1411. In memory of his brother, Oldřich Zajíc of Hazmburk founded the altarpiece of St. Johns in their family chapel at St Vitus Cathedral.

The picture itself survived separately in the possession of the Metropolitan Chapter. The picture's frame was purchased in 1883 from the estate of Josef Vojtěch Hellich for the Prague City Museum, from where it came to gallery of the Society of Patriotic Friends of Art. In 1937 Vincenc Kramář, director of the Society, joined both parts and since 1940 the picture and its frame have been loaned for display at the National Gallery in Prague. Information from the St. Vitus inventory of the late 15th century mentions a beautiful panel of the Virgin Mary with the portraits of the four Evangelists and four patron saints of the Czech lands. It is recorded that they were painted by ‘Prague Panices’ (Prague Junkers) – free artists who appear in written sources from the 15th century. The St Vitus Madonna was exhibited in New York City in 2005.

== Description and context ==
The picture in a cut frame decorated with twelve portraits is painted in tempera on a chalk base, on a soft-wood panel covered with stretched canvas. It is 51 x 39.5 cm in size. In the 1850s amethysts donated by Canon Pešina were added to the halo (these were later removed). The composition as a whole adheres to older models of Marian pictures. The picture of the St Vitus Madonna is directly related to sculptures in the International Gothic style and demonstrates how painting could have been directly influenced by contemporary sculpture. Stylistically it corresponds to artistic development in Bohemia around 1400 and, with its perfection of form, became the prototype of the Beautiful Madonnas.

The medallions with portraits in low detailed reliefs, that decorate the frame, depict half-figures of four patron saints of the Czech lands: St. Wenceslaus, St. Sigisgmund, St. Vitus and St. Adalbert (vertically); John the Baptist and John the Evangelist (top) and St. Procopius (?) and a kneeling archbishop, possibly the donor Jan of Jenštejn or the deceased Zbyněk Zajíc of Hazmburk (bottom). In the corners of the frame there are four quadrilobes with figures of angels bearing ribbons on which there are fragments of the text of the popular 12th-century Marian antiphon Regina coeli, laetare in which the faithful looked for protection against the plaque. Gemstones are indicated between the portraits; these were usually part of works meant for worshipping. The picture originally stood on the altar independently, since on its reverse it was decorated with silver foil.

This work dates from the high period of the Marian cult around 1400. It represents one of the two main types – the Madonna holding the child on her right side and both figures directing their gaze towards the viewer. Jesus's mortal human origin is emphasised by his nudity and several details (such as his mother pressing her fingers into his skin). These details also have Eucharistic significance, referring to Corpus Christi. This concept of the Marian image was widespread in the period before the Hussite Wars broke out.

=== Related works ===
- Madonna of Lnáře (1400-1420)
- The Týn Madonna
- The Madonna of Svojšín, differing in detail, since it has a crown as the Queen of Heaven, instead of a veil
- The Madonna of Jindřichův Hradec (a small format for private worship, not to be confused with the Madonna of Jindřichův Hradec (1460)
- Madonna of Vyšší Brod Monastery (1415-1420)
- Madonna of Wrocław (1417-1418)
- Illumination in the missal of Zbyněk Zajíc of Hazmburk (1409)

=== Later replicas ===
- Madonna of Jindřichův Hradec
- Madonna of Český Krumlov
- Madonna of Brussels
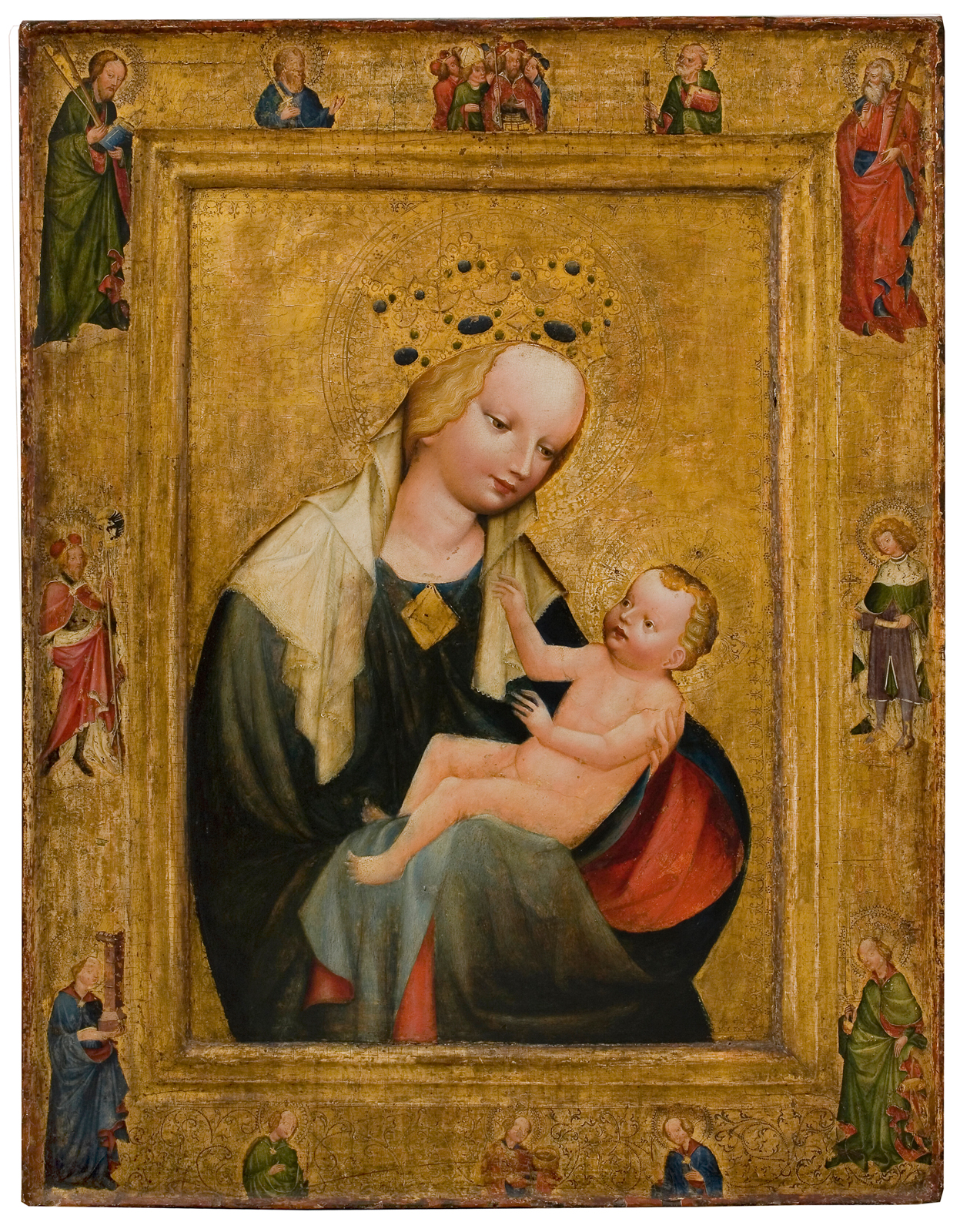
Madonna of St. Trinity from České Budějovice, AJG Hluboká nad Vltavou

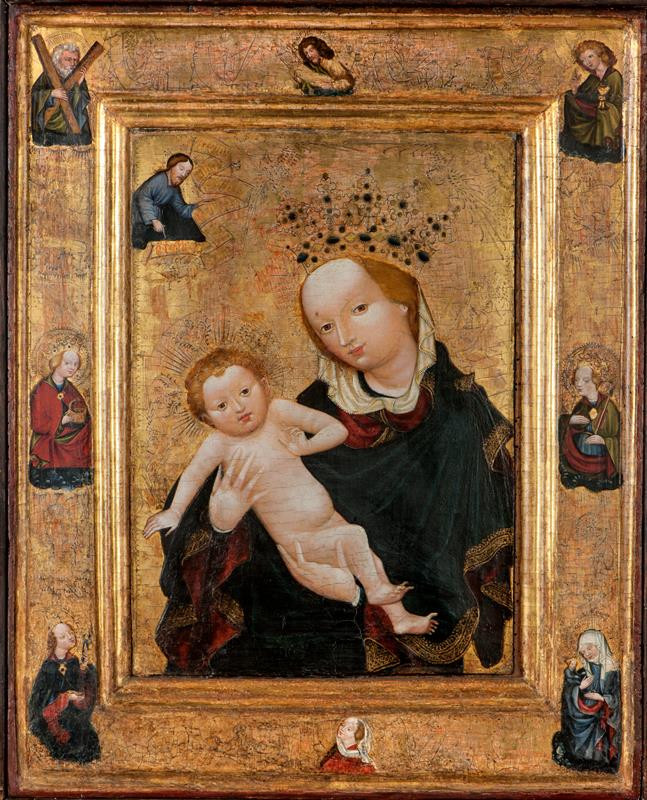
Madonna of St Thomas, reverse Veraikon (1420-1440), Moravian Gallery in Brno
