= Robert Suckale =

German art historian (1943–2020)

Robert Suckale (30 October 1943 – 13 February 2020) was a German art historian, medievalist and professor at Technische Universität Berlin.

== Life ==
Suckale was born in Königsberg. Suckale completed his studies in art history with the subsidiary subjects classical archaeology and Latin philology of the Middle Ages at the Humboldt University of Berlin, the University of Bonn, the University of Paris and LMU Munich in 1970 with a doctorate under Wolfgang Braunfels at LMU Munich. He then worked at the Zentralinstitut für Kunstgeschichte in Munich and from 1971 was a research assistant to Braunfels at the Institut für Kunstgeschichte of LMU Munich. In 1976, he was awarded a doctorate with a thesis on the Klosterbibliothek Metten manuscripts from the years 1414/1415 Habilitated. In 1980, he was appointed to the chair of art history at the University of Bamberg. In 1990, Suckale was appointed to the Department of Art History at Technische Universität Berlin; in 2004, he had to retire early due to illness, but continued to be academically active. In 2011, the Courtauld Institute of the University of London awarded him an honorary doctorate. In 2014, he was elected to the American Academy of Arts and Sciences.

Suckale was married to the art historian Gude Suckale-Redlefsen, with whom he also jointly published.

== Academic work ==
Students learn from him respect for the original, what questions to ask it on the spot and how to reveal its meanings, layer by layer. This approach is based on the belief that stylistic forms are not unfounded, but can be traced back to historical, economic, technical, religious or humanistic backgrounds..

Suckale's work was distinguished by its international horizon, which included not only the German-speaking countries, but also France, Italy and the countries of East Central Europe. His work showed that art studies need a pan-European perspective and cross-border research. At the centre of his interest are the works of art themselves, which he sees alternating between a technical close-up view and a historical panoramic view. In doing so, he also took the various genres from panel painting to cult object to architecture into a common focus. The anchoring of monument conservation in university teaching was particularly close to his heart. Thus he was instrumental in setting up the postgraduate course in monument conservation at the TU Berlin, something he had already done once in Bamberg. He prevented the art history section at the TU Berlin from being wound up and is one of the founding fathers of the Schinkel Centre for Architecture, Urban Research and Monument Preservation at the TU Berlin.

Suckale died in Berlin at the age of 76.

Important stations in his work:

- 1988 Head of a section of the congress of the Comité International d'Histoire de l'Art (CIHA) in Munich ("Court and City in the Late Middle Ages"), at the same time head of a section of the German Art Historians' Conference in Frankfurt (building research and building history).
- January to May 1992: Visiting Professor at Harvard University
- In 1996, in cooperation with the University of Bamberg, he initiated the research training group "History of Art - Building Research - Preservation of Monuments", funded by the DFG (terminated in 2005).
- Winter semester 1997/98 - summer semester 1998: as Richard Krautheimer Professor at the Bibliotheca Hertziana in Rome
- 2005 :Fellow at the Institute for Advanced Study of Princeton University

== Publications (selection) ==
- Studien zu Stilbildung und Stilwandel der Madonnenstatuen der Ile-de-France zwischen 1230 und 1300. Phil. Diss. Munich 1971.
- Claude Monet: Die Kathedrale von Rouen. Munich 1981.
- Gotik. Von Giotto bis Lochner (Ingo F. Walther [ed.]: Das neue Museum der Malerei. 1), Herrsching 1983.
- with Dieter Kimpel: Die gotische Architektur in Frankreich 1130–1270. Hirmer, Munich 1985, 2nd revised edition Munich 1995.
- Gude Suckale-Redlefsen: Mauritius-Der Heilige Mohr. The Black Saint Maurice. Munich 1987 (Mitautor).
- Die Hofkunst Kaiser Ludwigs des Bayern. Hirmer, Munich 1993.
- Rogier van der Weyden. Die Johannestafel. Das Bild als stumme Predigt (Das Kunststück, Fischer Taschenbuch 11990), Frankfurt, 1995.
- Kunst in Deutschland. Von Karl dem Großen bis Heute. Cologne 1998 (2. korrigierte Auflage 2005 unter dem Titel: Dumont Geschichte der Kunst in Deutschland ISBN 978-3-8321-7643-3); Review by Ilona Lehnart
- Evangelisches Damenstift Obernkirchen (DKV-Kunstführer. 165/9) Deutscher Kunstverlag, Münich 1999.
- mit Gude Suckale-Redlefsen: Stift Obernkirchen, Kreis Schaumburg. Königstein/Taunus 2001.
- Die mittelalterlichen Damenstifte als Bastionen der Frauenmacht (Schriftenreihe der Kölner Juristischen Gesellschaft. 25). Otto Schmidt Verlag, Cologne 2001.
- Das mittelalterliche Bild als Zeitzeuge. Sechs Studien. Lukas Verlag, Berlin 2002, ISBN 3-931836-70-3.
- Editor: Rudolf Berliner (1886-1967). Lukas Verlag, Berlin 2003, ISBN 9783931836719.
- Peter Schmidt, Gregor Wedekind (ed.): Stil und Funktion. Ausgewählte Schriften zur Kunst des Mittelalters. Deutscher Kunstverlag, Münich and Berlin 2003 (2nd edition 2008, ISBN 978-3-422-06791-2).
- Die Erneuerung der Malkunst vor Dürer. 2 volumes, Imhof, Petersberg 2009, ISBN 978-3-86568-130-0.
- Klosterreform und Buchkunst. Die Handschriften des Mettener Abtes Peter I. Petersberg 2011, ISBN 978-3-86568-723-4.
- Auf den Spuren einer vergessenen Königin. Ein Hauptwerk der Pariser Hofkunst im Bode-Museum. Für die Skulpturensammlung und das Museum für Byzantinische Kunst, Staatliche Museen zu Berlin, edited by Julien Chapuis, mit einer technologischen Untersuchung von Bodo Buczynski, Petersberg 2013, ISBN 978-3-7319-0012-2.
