= Heinrich IV. Parler =

German sculptor

- Occupation: Architect

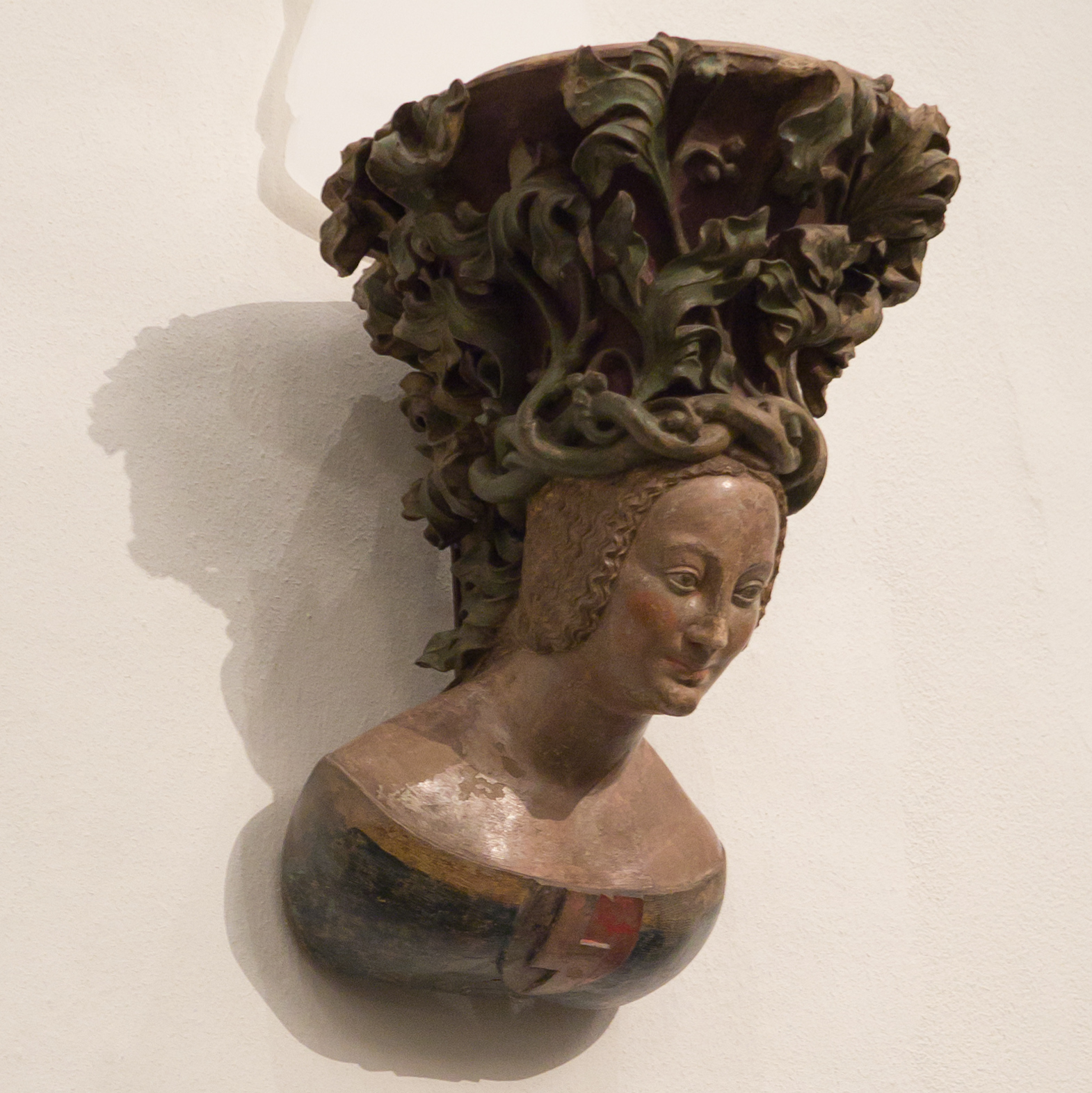
Parler-bust at the Schnütgen-Museum.

Heinrich Parler the Younger, also known as Heinrich von Gmünd, Heinrich of Freiburg, or Heinrich IV Parler, was a sculptor in the second half of the fourteenth century. He is the best-known sculptor of the Parler family, a german family of stonemasons, construction foremen and architects whose members strongly influenced the Gothic style in German countries, Bohemia, Austria and northern Italy.

He probably belongs to the Parler family because of his double-square mason's mark which echoes those of other Parler, and he bears the same name “von Gmünd” as other craftsmen and architects in the family. He is likely the son of Johann Parler the Elder and the brother of Michel of Freibourg.

We have traces of his activity in Schwäbisch Gmünd through a statue of Christ carrying the Cross. In the 1370s, he was in Prague with Peter Parler at St. Vitus Cathedral. We know of him the tombstones of Bretislav I and Spytihněv II in the central chapel of the cathedral (1373) and the busts of the triforium.

After 1381, he was construction foreman of Margrave Jobst of Moravia. In 1387, he was in Cologne, where his wife Drutginis of Savoye was born; Drutginis was the daughter of Michel of Savoye, a foreman at Cologne Cathedral. He worked probably on sculptures of the St. Peter's portal of the cathedral.

A bust kept at the Schnütgen Museum is attributed to Heinrich: it depicts a woman, bearing the Parlers seal (1378), representing Eve. This bust undoubtedly comes from Cologne Cathedral. The bust is carved in sandstone, like the 34 prophets and saints of the St. Peter's portal. The style of Heinrich influenced a sculptural tendency of "soft style" of this era, and possibly foreshadowed the bohemian style of the "Beautiful Madonnas" of the 1380s, such as the Beautiful Madonna of Toruń.
