= Johannes von Gmünd =

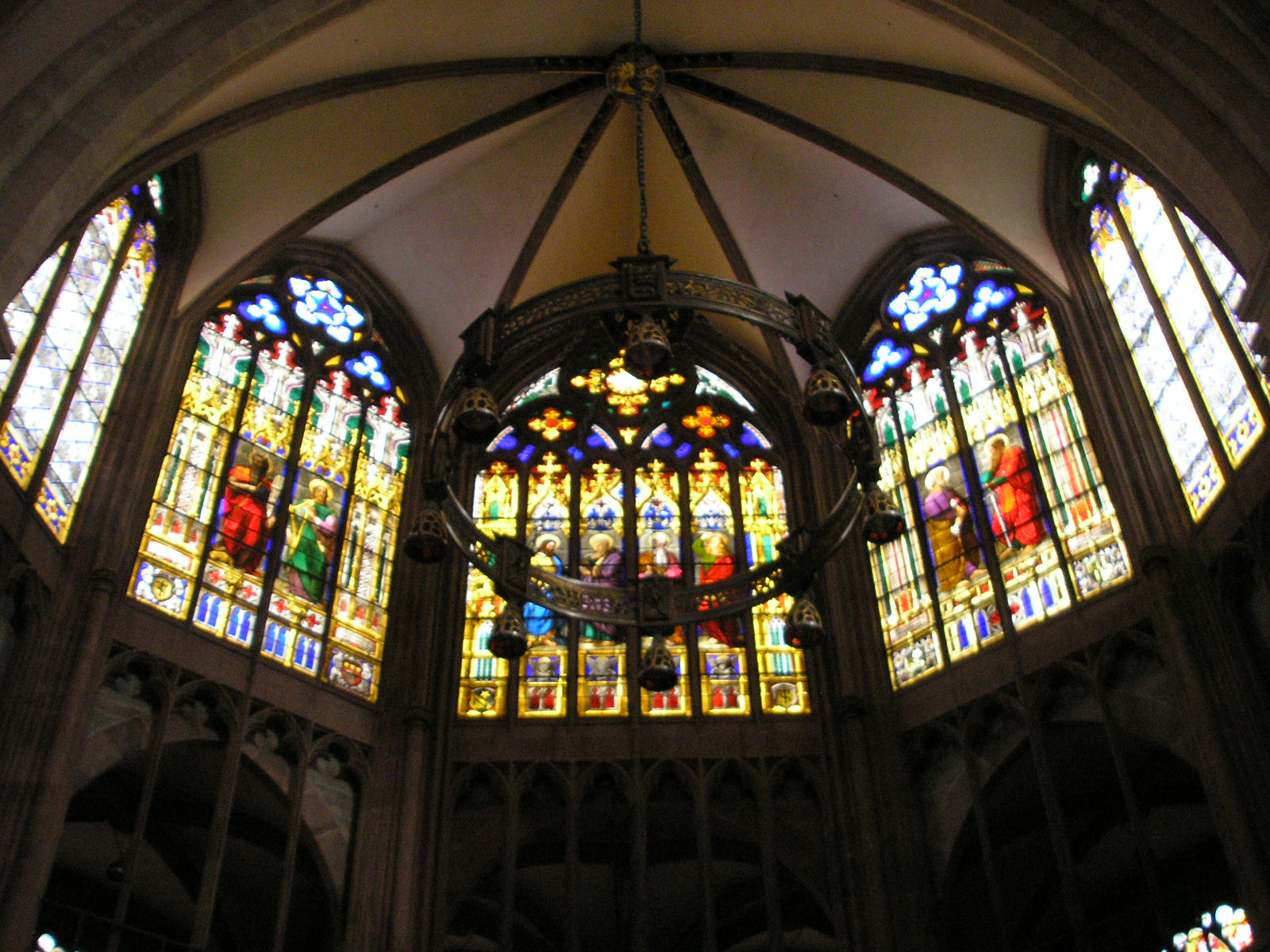
Basel Minster: clerestory was restored after the earthquake of 1356.

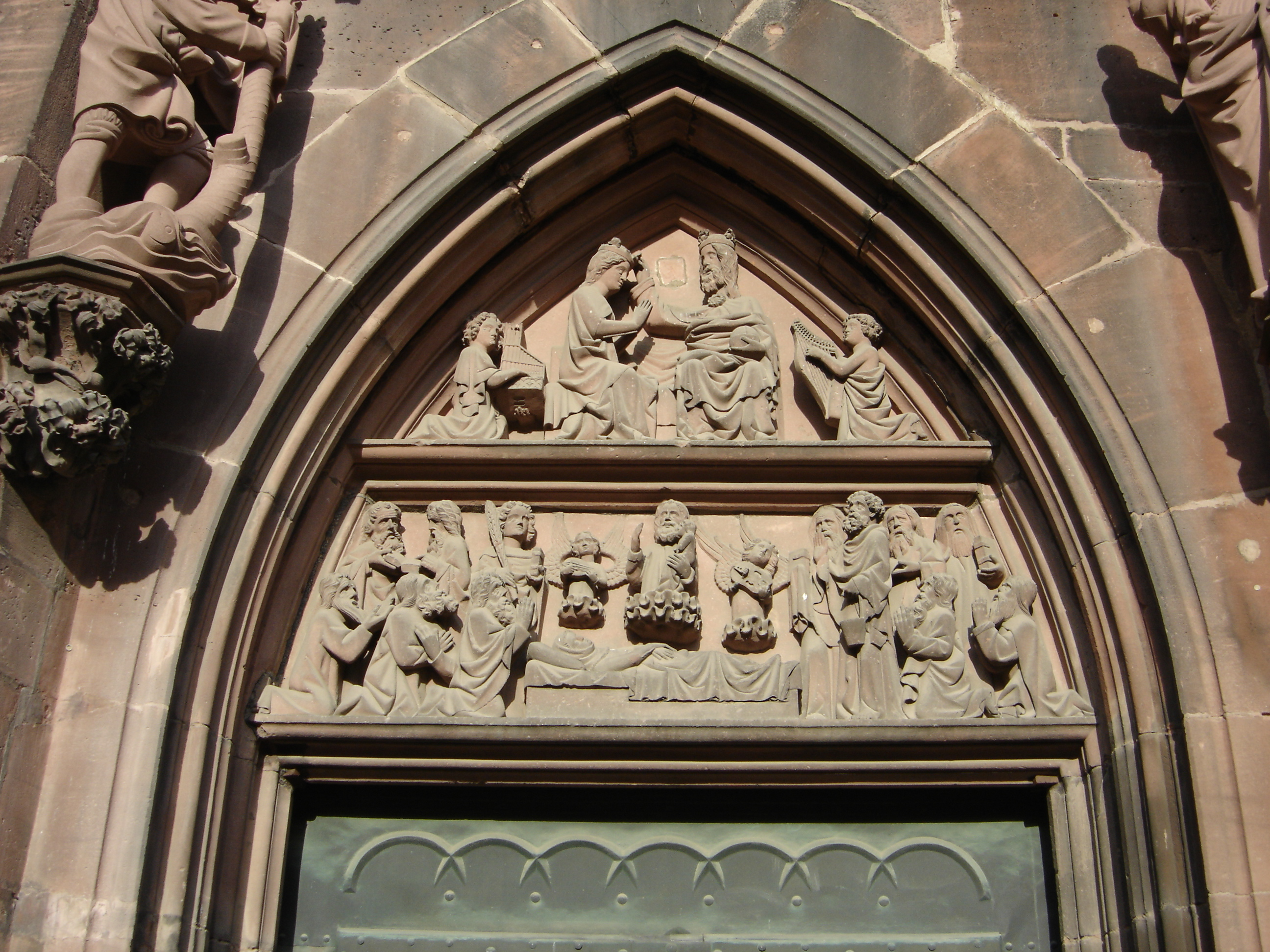
South portal of the Freiburg Minster.

Johannes von Gmünd (1320–30 – after 1359) was a German Gothic architect and construction foreman who probably belonged to the Parler family.

He was probably born in Schwäbisch Gmünd. He probably is the eldest son of Heinrich Parler and brother of Michael and Peter Parler. He sometimes is referred to as Johann Parler the Elder to distinguish him from his nephew Johann Parler the Younger.

In 1354, Johannes von Gmünd worked on the construction of the choir of the cathedral of Freiburg; in 1359 he was hired for life on the site as a "citizen of Freiburg".

He also worked on the restoration of the cathedral of Basel, in particular the choir, due to the earthquake of 1356.

He probably is the father of two other members of the Parler family:

- Michael von Gmünd, foreman at the Strasbourg Cathedral;
- Heinrich IV. Parler, sculptor in Prague and Cologne.
