= Ulm Minster =

Lutheran church in Germany; second tallest church in the world

- Ulmer Münster (German)
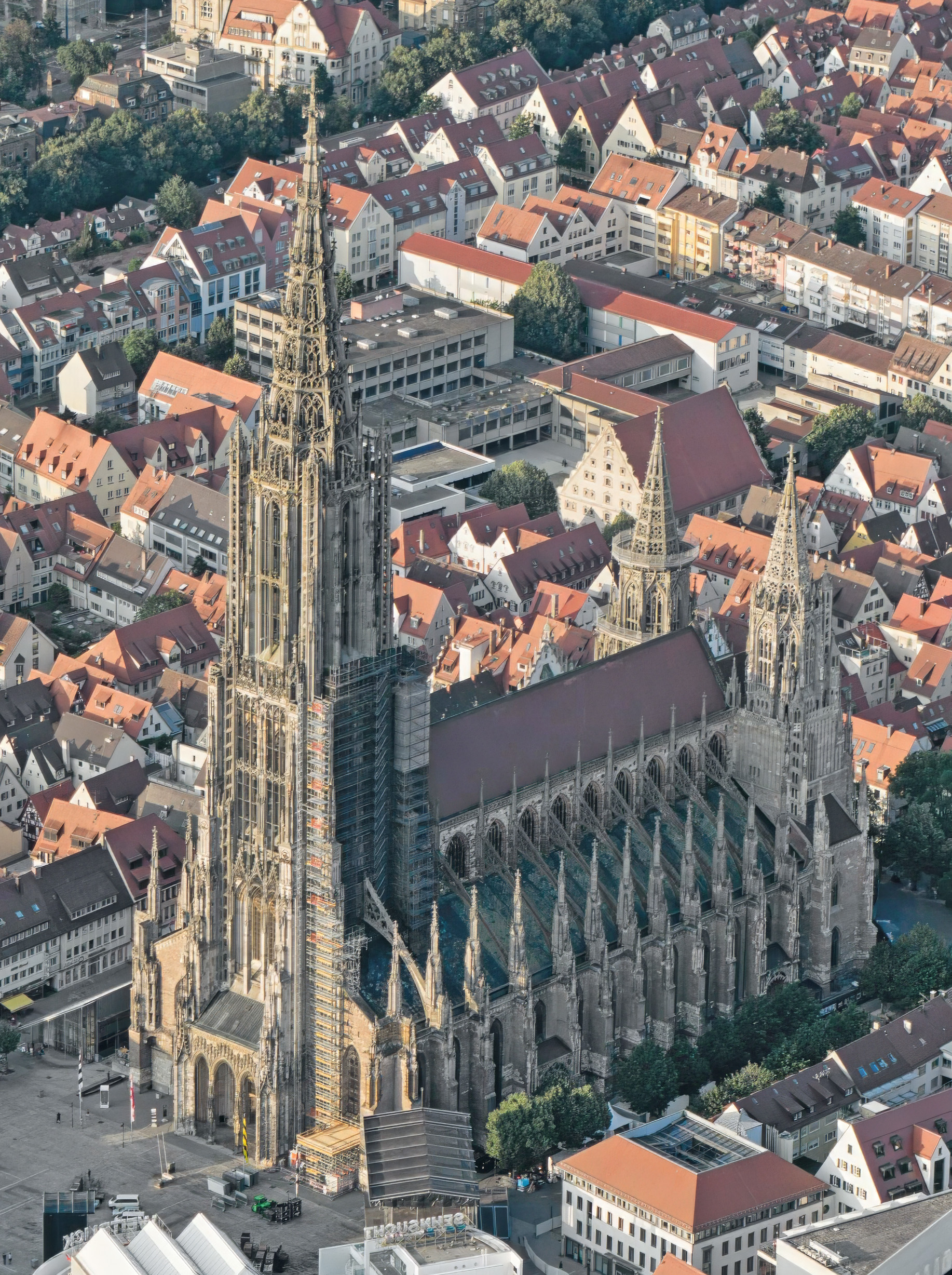
- Ulm Minster, aerial view (2014)

- Location in Germany
- 48°23′55″N 9°59′33″E
- Location: Ulm
- Country: Germany
- Denomination: Evangelical Church in Germany
- Previous denomination: Roman Catholic
- Website: www.ulmer-muenster.de

History
- Status: Minster; Parish church

Architecture
- Functional status: Active
- Architect: Heinrich Parler
- Architectural type: Minster
- Style: Gothic
- Groundbreaking: 1377

Specifications
- Capacity: 2,000

Administration
- Division: Evangelical-Lutheran Church in Württemberg
- Building details

Record height
- Tallest in the world from 1890 to 1894^{[I]}
- Preceded by: Cologne Cathedral
- Surpassed by: Philadelphia City Hall

General information
- Construction started: 1377
- Completed: 31 May 1890

Height
- Height: 161.5 m (530 ft)

Ulm Minster (German: Ulmer Münster) is a Gothic church of the Evangelical Church in Germany located in Ulm, Baden-Württemberg. It is the second-tallest church building in the world, with a steeple measuring 161.53 metres (530.0 ft). The church was the fourth-tallest structure in the world when the towers were completed in 1890.

Though it is sometimes referred to as Ulm Cathedral because of its great size, the church is not a cathedral as it has never been the episcopal see of a bishop. Though the towers and all decorative elements are of stone masonry, attracting the attention of visitors, most of the walls, including the façades of the nave and choir, actually consist of visible brick. Therefore, the building is sometimes referred to as a brick church. As such, it lays claim to the rank of second- to fourth-largest, after San Petronio Basilica in Bologna and together with Frauenkirche in Munich and St. Mary's Church in Gdańsk. The tower however was mainly built from sandstone.

Ulm Minster was begun in the Gothic architecture of the Late Middle Ages but the building was not completed until the late 19th century after a hiatus of centuries. When work ceased in the 16th century all of the church except the towers and some outer decorations were complete, unlike at Cologne Cathedral, where less than half of the work had been done before construction halted in the 15th century.

Visitors can climb the 768 steps that lead to the top of the minster's spire. At 143 m (469 ft) it gives a panoramic view of Ulm in Baden-Württemberg and Neu-Ulm in Bavaria and, in clear weather, a vista of the Alps from Säntis to the Zugspitze. The final stairwell to the top (known as the third Gallery) is a tall, spiralling staircase that has barely enough room for one person.

== History ==
=== First construction phase, 1377–1543 ===
The original parish church in Ulm was built at the gate of the city outside the walls, and this caused much trouble for the citizens of the city in the 14th century's conflicts that involved Ulm, as demonstrated by Emperor Charles IV's siege of the city. This parish church had also been subordinated to Reichenau Monastery by Charlemagne in 813, and the denizens of Ulm wanted a new, independent church inside the city's walls. To this end, the near 10,000 inhabitants of the city decided to finance construction themselves. On 30 June 1377, Mayor Ludwig Krafft laid the first stone, the foundation stone, of the new church. This church's design was given to Heinrich Parler, the architect of Holy Cross Minster in Schwäbisch Gmünd. The first plan was to build a stepped hall church with aisles as wide and almost as high as the central nave, with a main spire on the west and two steeples above the choir (29 meters (95 ft) long, 15 meters (49 ft) wide). The women of the Ulmer Assemblage would also make their contributions to the foundation works, something memorialized by 17th- and 18th-century composer Barbara Kluntz.

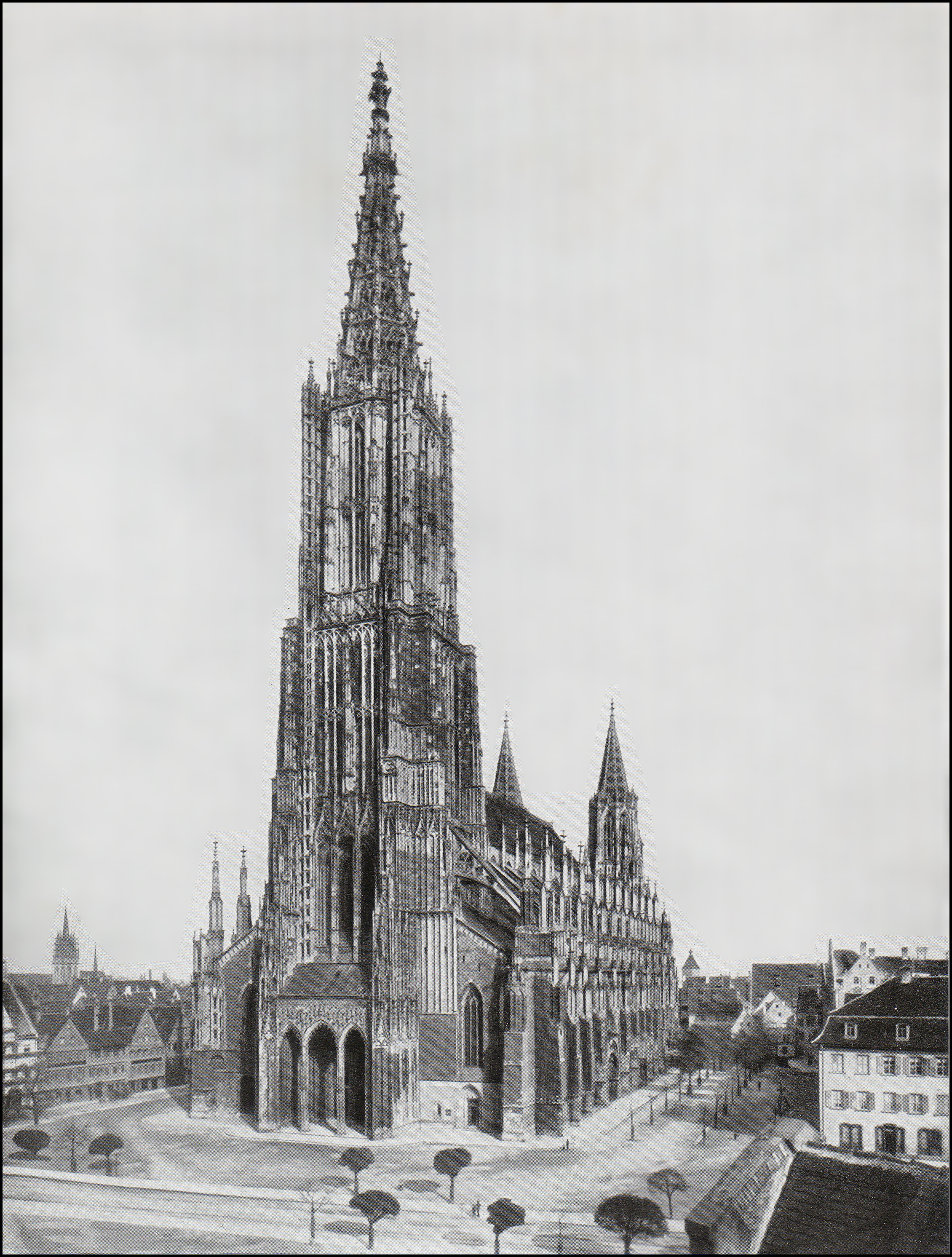
Ulm Minster in 1910

Michael Parler II, who had experience from working at the Dombauhütte in Prague, assumed construction of the church in 1381 and continued work on the nave, which had originally been conceived as a triple-aisled hall church with approximately equal height and width. From 1387 to 1391, Heinrich III Parler managed construction as head of the Bauhütte. Then in 1392 Ulrich Ensingen, associated with Strasbourg Cathedral, was appointed master builder. It was Parler's plan to construct the Ulm Minster's 150-meter (490 ft) spire, the highest of any church. In order to balance its proportions, the nave was now to be much taller than the Parlers had intended, making a noticeable difference in height between the chancel and nave. The church was consecrated on 25 July 1405. In 1446, Ulrich's son Matthäus took over construction and finished the choir vault in 1449 and the vault over the northern nave in 1452. When he died in 1463, his own son, Moritz, took over construction. Himself dying in 1471, he completed the vaulting over the nave and constructed the sacrament house, finally making the church a basilica according to Ulrich's plan.

In 1477, Matthäus Böblinger took over and made changes to the plans of the church but especially to the main tower and in doing so caused the church's first major structural threat: the heavy vaults of the wide aisles and high nave burdened the columns with too much lateral force at different heights. A new master builder, Burkhart Engelberg of Augsburg, tackled the structural damage by reinforcing the foundation of the west tower and demolishing the heavy aisle vaults and replacing them with vaults of half widths, which afforded rows of additional columns dividing each of the aisles in two. Although catastrophe had been avoided, the walls were left without their buttresses for 350 years and the northern wall of the nave bulges outward by 27 centimeters (11 in) even today.

In a referendum in 1530/31, the citizens of Ulm converted to Protestantism during the Reformation. Ulm Minster became a Lutheran church. Despite its vast size, it is not a cathedral, as the responsible bishop of the Evangelical-Lutheran Church in Württemberg – member of the Evangelical Church in Germany – resides in Stuttgart.

In 1543, construction work ceased at a time when the steeple had reached a height of some 100 metres (330 ft). The suspension of the building process was due to a variety of factors which were political and religious, like the Reformation, as well as economic, since the discovery of the Americas during the voyages of Christopher Columbus 1492–1504, the Portuguese discovery of the sea route to India in 1497–1499, and Magellan's circumnavigation of the globe led to an epochal shift in trade routes and commodities. One result was economic stagnation and a steady decline, preventing major public expenditure.

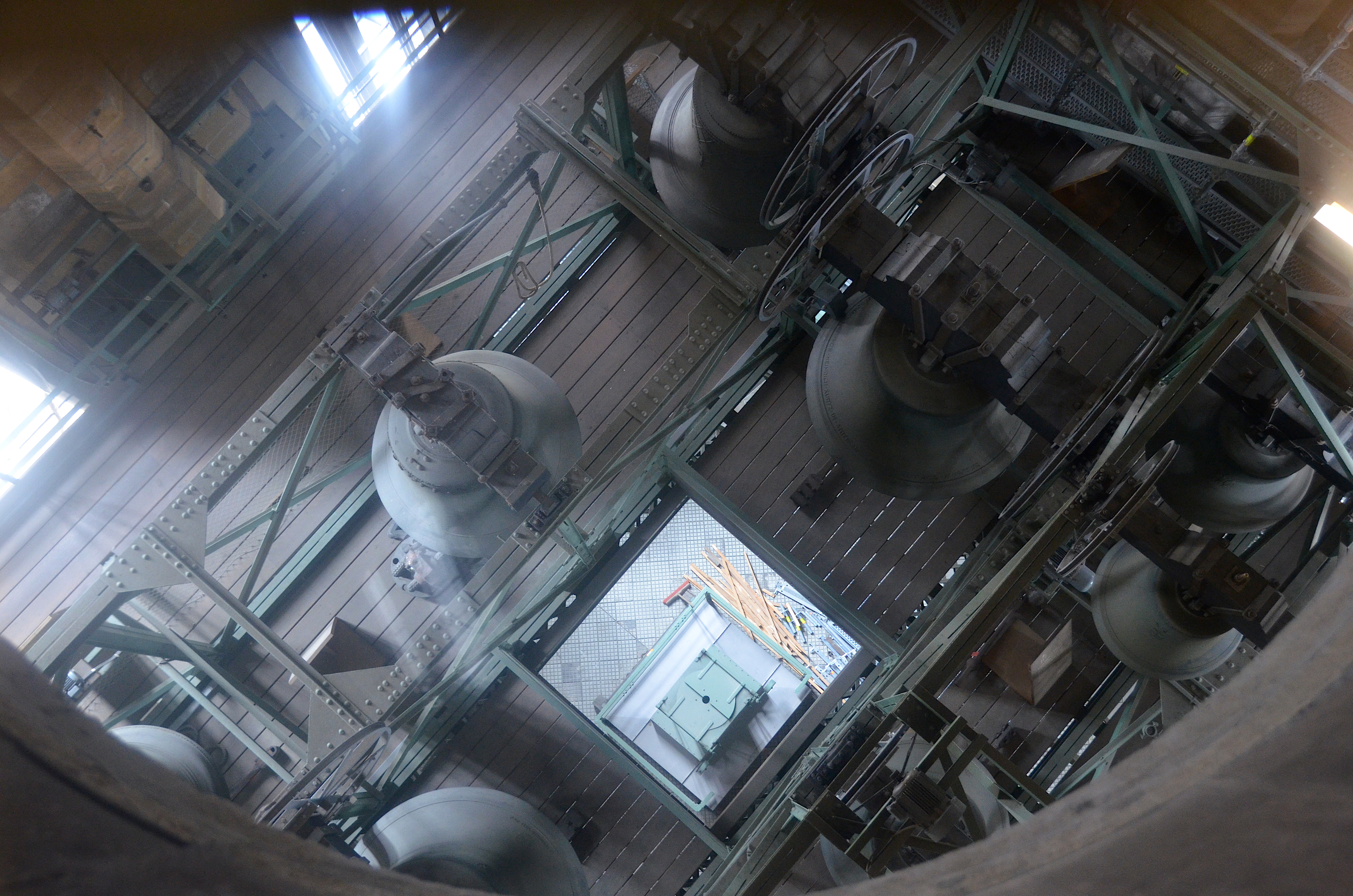
Church bells of the Ulm Minster seen from above (2019)

=== Resumption and completion of construction, 1844–1890 ===
In 1817, the interior frescos were covered by painting the walls grey. In 1844, construction work resumed. After a phase of repairs lasting until 1856, the central nave was stabilized by the addition of flying buttresses. Then the small steeples beside the choir were built – without medieval plans. At last, the main steeple was completed, changing the available medieval plan in making it about ten metres taller. Finally, on 31 May 1890 the building was completed.

=== World War II ===
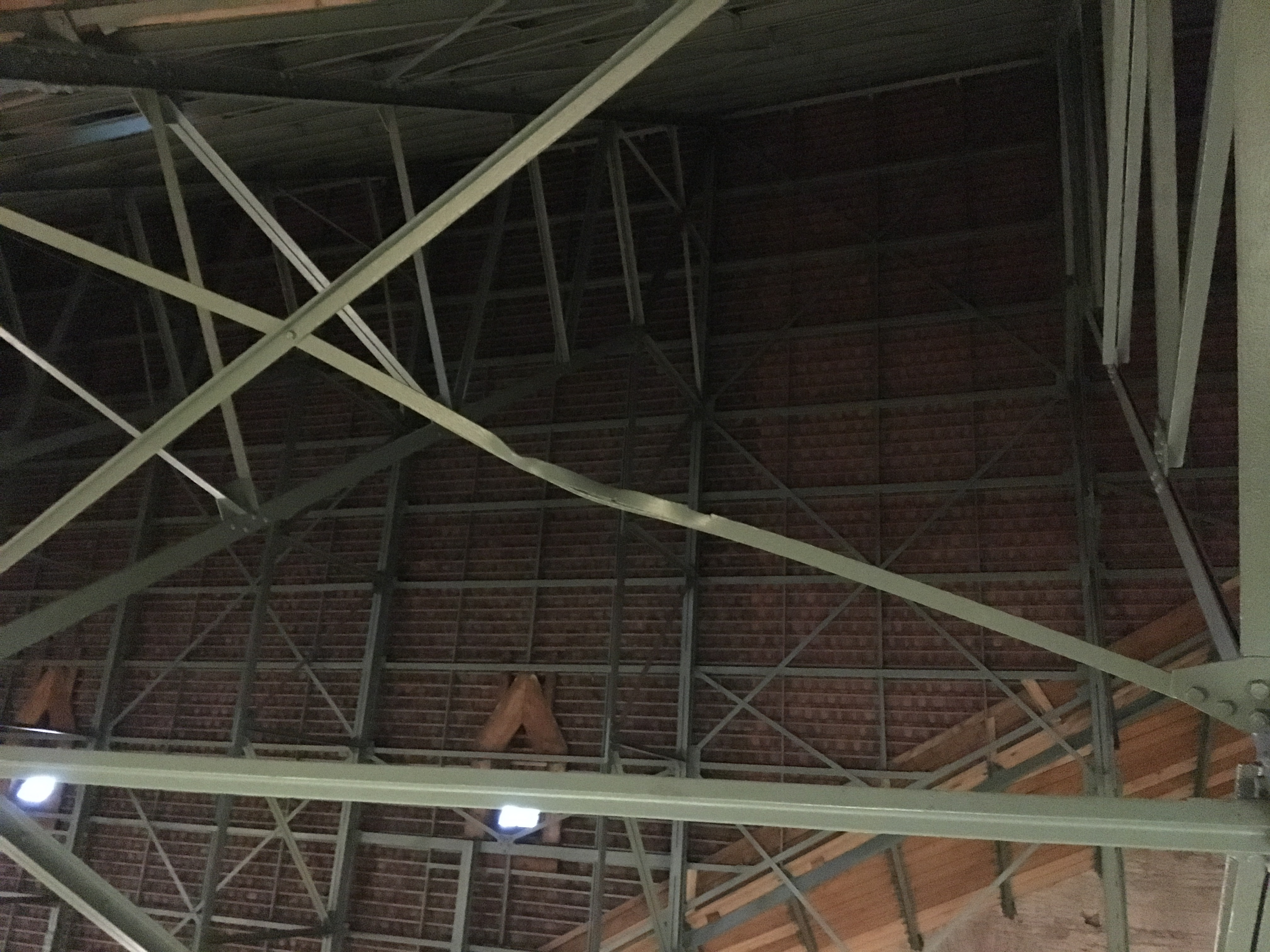
An undetonated WWII bomb deformed the steel construction over the choir.

A devastating air raid hit Ulm on 17 December 1944, which destroyed nearly the entire town west of the church to the railway station and north of the church to the outskirts. The church was barely damaged. However, almost all the other buildings of the town square (Münsterplatz) were severely hit and some 80% of the medieval centre of Ulm was destroyed.

A 500 kg bomb fell on 1 March 1945, in the choir-room of the minster, but it did not explode.

=== Current events ===
Due to renovation work, the Minster Tower had been closed after the first platform (70 m) and parts of the nave have been closed to visitors since March 2023; however, as of August 2024 the tower is now open up to the second platform and only the uppermost portion remains off limits. The church's height was surpassed on 30 October 2025 by the Sagrada Família in Barcelona, by then still unfinished.

== Bells ==
The tower contains 13 bells in total and only 10 of the 13 swing. Five bells including the bourdon Gloriosa were cast by Heinrich Kurtz in Stuttgart 1956 after the confiscation of five bells for weapon production in World War II. Three bells serve for the clock, Leichenglocke is responsible to chime the quarter-hours, followed by the second bourdon Dominica chimes the hours. Prior to Dominica chiming the hours, a small bell called the Schlagglocke in the octagon also calls the hours.

Only 9 of the 10 main bells swing electronically; this is because one of them, known as the Schwörglocke, rings only on Oath Monday via hand. The Schwörglocke is also the oldest bell in the Minster. In Germany, the bells are always numbered from largest to smallest, Bell 1 is always the tenor or bourdon.

No.	Name (German)	Name (International)	Mass (kg)	Tone
1	Gloriosa (Bourdon Bell)		4,912	a flat^{0}
2	Dominica (2nd Bourdon Bell)		4,301	b flat^{0}
3	Große Betglocke	Large prayer bell	3,800	c^{1}
4	Leichenglocke	Funeral bell	1,750	d flat^{1}
5	Kleine Betglocke	Small prayer bell	1,766	e flat^{1}
6	Kreuzglocke	Cross bell	1,248	f^{1}
7	Landfeuerglocke	Country fire bell	900	a flat^{1}
8	Taufglocke	Baptismal bell	506	b flat^{1}
9	Schiedglocke	Arbitration bell	345	c^{2}
10	Schwörglocke	Oath Bell	3,500	c^{1}

== Architecture ==
While the walls of the choir, the side aisles and the tower were constructed of brick, the upper levels of the nave are ashlar, using sandstone from Isny im Allgäu. Limestone from the nearby Swabian Jura was used in small quantities.

Works of art

- Late medieval sculptures include the tympanum of the main Western entrance depicts scenes from the Genesis. The central column bears a sculpture, the Man of Sorrows, by the local master Hans Multscher.
- The 15th-century choir stalls by Jörg Syrlin the Elder, made from oak and adorned with hundreds of carved busts are among the most famous pews of the Gothic period.
- The pulpit canopy is by Jörg Syrlin the Younger.
- The original high altar was destroyed by the iconoclasts of the Reformation. The current altarpiece from the early 16th century is a triptych, showing figures of the Holy Family and the Last Supper in the predella.
- The five stained glass windows of the apse, which is in the form of half a decagon, show Biblical scenes and date to the 14th and 15th century.
- The main organ of the church was destroyed by iconoclasts and replaced in the late 16th century. Wolfgang Amadeus Mozart is known to have played it in 1763. For some decades it was the largest organ in existence. In the late 1960s it was reconstructed to solve acoustic problems of reverberation.
- In 1877, the Jewish congregation of the synagogue of Ulm – including Hermann Einstein, the father of Albert Einstein – donated money for a statue of the Biblical prophet Jeremiah. The figure was placed below the main organ.
- Later renovations in the modern era added gargoyles and a sculpture, The Beggar, by the expressionist Ernst Barlach.

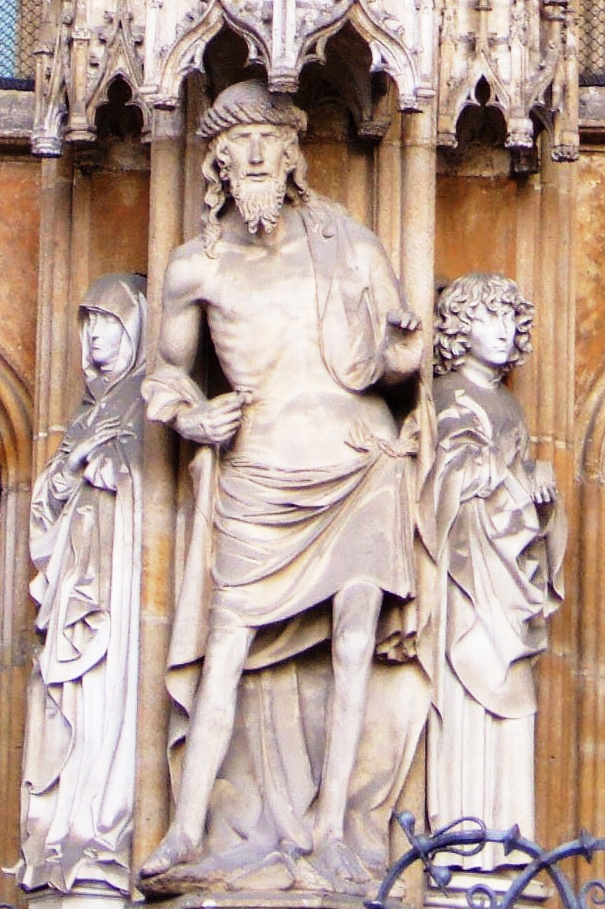
Man of Sorrows on the main portal by Hans Multscher

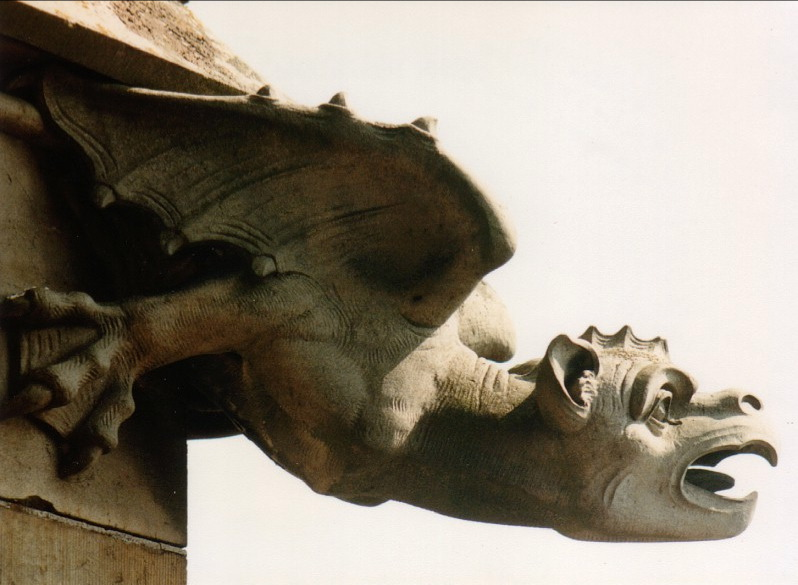
Dragon gargoyle on the way up the stairs of the Ulmer Münster steeple

=== Plan ===
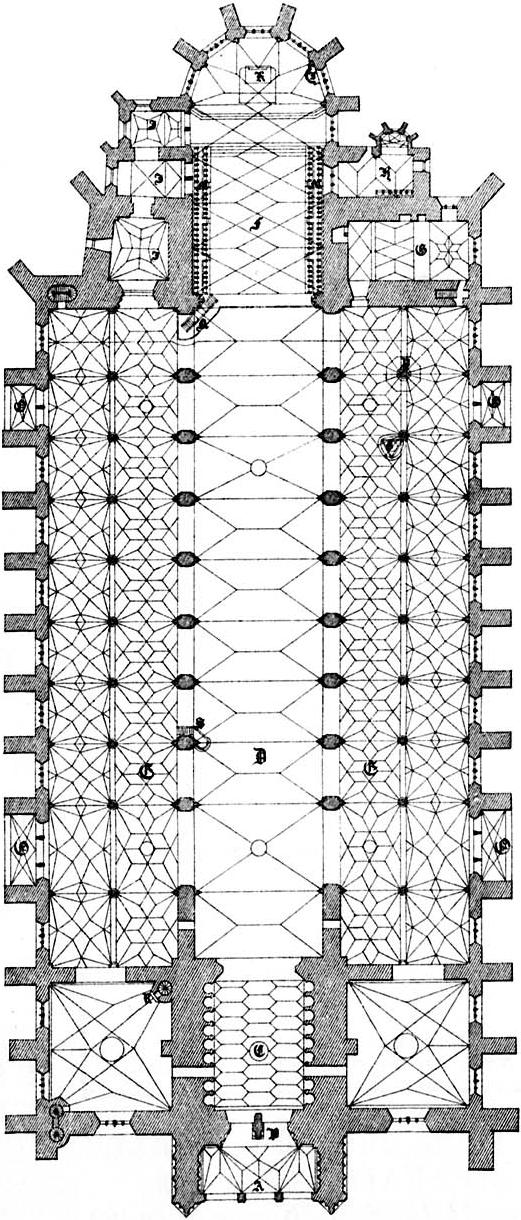
Plan

- A. Entrance hall.
- B. Main porch.
- C. Tower hall.
- D. Nave.
- E. Aisles.
- F. Choir.
- G. Sacristy.
- H. Besserer Chapel.
- J. Reithart Chapel.
- K. High altar.
- L. Old tabernacle.
- M. Choir stalls.
- N. Tabernacle.
- O. Baptismal font.
- P. Holy-water font.
- Q. Side porches.
- R. Organ entrance.
- S. Pulpit.

==== Measurements ====
- The church has a length of 123.56 metres (405.4 ft) and a width of 48.8 metres (160 ft).
- The building area is approximately 8,260 square metres (88,900 sq ft).
- The height of the central nave is 41.6 metres (136 ft), whilst the lateral naves are 20.55 metres (67.4 ft) high.
- The volume of the edifice is some 190,000 cubic metres (6,700,000 cu ft).
- The weight of the main steeple is estimated at 51,500 tonnes (50,700 long tons; 56,800 short tons).
- The church seats a congregation of 2,000.
- In the Middle Ages, before pews were introduced, it could accommodate 20,000 people, when the population of the town was about 5,000.

== See also ==
- Gothic cathedrals and churches
- Strasbourg Cathedral
- Cologne Cathedral
- Gothic architecture
- Protestant Reformation
- List of tallest structures built before the 20th century

Records
Preceded by Cologne Cathedral	Tallest building in the world 1890–1901; 161.5 m (530 ft)	Succeeded by Philadelphia City Hall
Preceded by Cologne Cathedral	Tallest building in Europe; 1890–1952; 161.5 m (530 ft)	Succeeded by Kotelnicheskaya Embankment Building
Preceded by Cologne Cathedral	Tallest church in the world 1890–2025; 161.5 m (530 ft)	Succeeded by Sagrada Família
