= Friesentor Madonna =

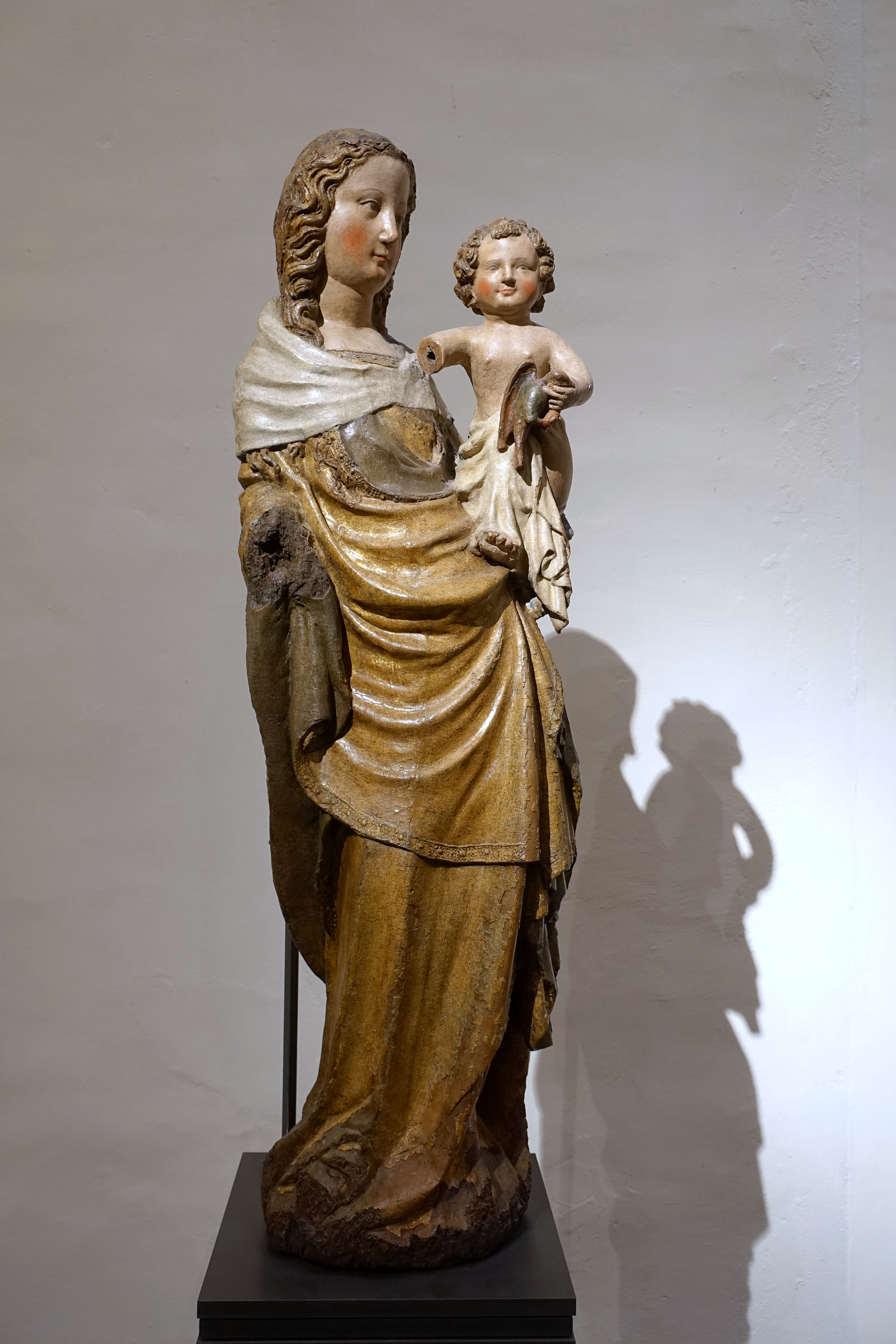
- Year: c. 1370-1380
- Medium: walnut wood
- Movement: Gothic art
- Dimensions: 132 cm × 41 cm × 32 cm (52 in × 16 in × 13 in)
- Location: Schnutgen Museum; Cologne, Germany

The Friesentor Madonna, also known as the Friesentor Virgin, is a sculpture of the Virgin Mary with Christ Child. It was created sometime around 1370-1380 and is attributed to a local sculptor. It is one of the best examples of a beautiful Madonna, a 15th century style of Madonna statues from Central Europe. This sculpture is on exhibit in the Schnütgen Museum in Cologne, Germany.

== History ==
The statue is named for its location prior to the Schnütgen Museum's acquisition. According to tradition, the statue was originally from the Friesentor in Cologne, an old city gate destroyed in 1882.

== Description ==
The statue depicts the Virgin Mary holding the Christ Child upright in her arms. She stands with the distinct S-curve of a beautiful Madonna. The Virgin's cloak delicately drapes over her shoulders and bunches at her left hip underneath the child, exposing the tunic underneath. The fabric of the Virgin's cloak and tunic lie close to her body, and they include waving folds that complement the figure's vertical, S-curved body.

The statue is relatively well preserved, and it retains its original and now faded polychrome. Both the Virgin and the Christ Child are missing their right forearm.

== Analysis ==
The stylistic features of the statue are similar to statues of the apostles from St. Peter's door at the south entrance of the Cologne Cathedral, attributed to the Parler family, an important family of architects and sculptors (the original statues are preserved at the Kolumba, Cologne's diocesan museum). Though contemporary to the Parlers, this statue is from a different art movement. It features bright, highlighted flesh tones and less prominent folds in the fabric. Based on this, the art piece can be dated to about 1370-1380. This makes it one of the oldest examples of beautiful Madonnas and, at the same time, one of the most valuable. Beautiful Madonnas are characterized by their solely devotional nature. They did not serve as reliquaries and have no space for relics inside. The beautiful Madonna's refined and idealized depiction of the Virgin and Child was most popular in early 15th century Central Europe.
