= Wenzel Parler =

South transept and main tower of St. Vitus Cathedral, Prague, work by Wenzel Parler and others.

Wenzel Parler (Czech: Václav Parléř, c. 1360—1404) was an architect and sculptor from the Parler family of German-Bohemian master builders and son of Peter Parler. He worked on Gothic churches in the Holy Roman cities of Prague, Nördlingen, and Vienna during the Late Middle Ages.

== Life ==
The first work of Wenzel Parler can be found in the second half of the 1370s in Prague, where he was instrumental in the construction of St. Vitus Cathedral until at least 1392. His brother Johann Parler the younger took over construction of the cathedral in 1398, and they in turn were succeeded by a certain Master Petrik. Under these three masters, the transept and the great tower were finished, as was the gable which connects the tower with the southern transept. Nicknamed Golden Gate, it became the portal through which kings of Bohemia entered the cathedral for coronation ceremonies.

He left Prague in 1398 and his younger brother Johann Parler the younger took over construction of the cathedral. Although not clearly documented, Wenzel probably went on to oversee construction of St. Salvator's Church (German: St.-Salvator-Kirchein) in Nördlingen, a free imperial city in the Holy Roman Empire. From 1400, he surfaced as a stonemason at St. Stephen's Cathedral in Vienna, where he became Dombaumeister (Master Builder of the Cathedral) from 1403. The original architectural idea for the southern tower was probably developed by Wenzel. The Italian Envoy there wanted to recruit him to Milan to oversee the building of Milan Cathedral, but Parler died in 1404 before he could take on the project.

Wenzel Parler's identity as the cathedral architect in Vienna is not fully confirmed. Wenceslas was a common name in Bohemia and southern Germany at that time, and Parler derives from Parlier, which means "foreman" or "construction manager." However, the fame of his family along with the timing and significant stylistic parallels between St. Vitus Cathedral and St. Stephen's Cathedral make the common identity likely.

== Gallery ==
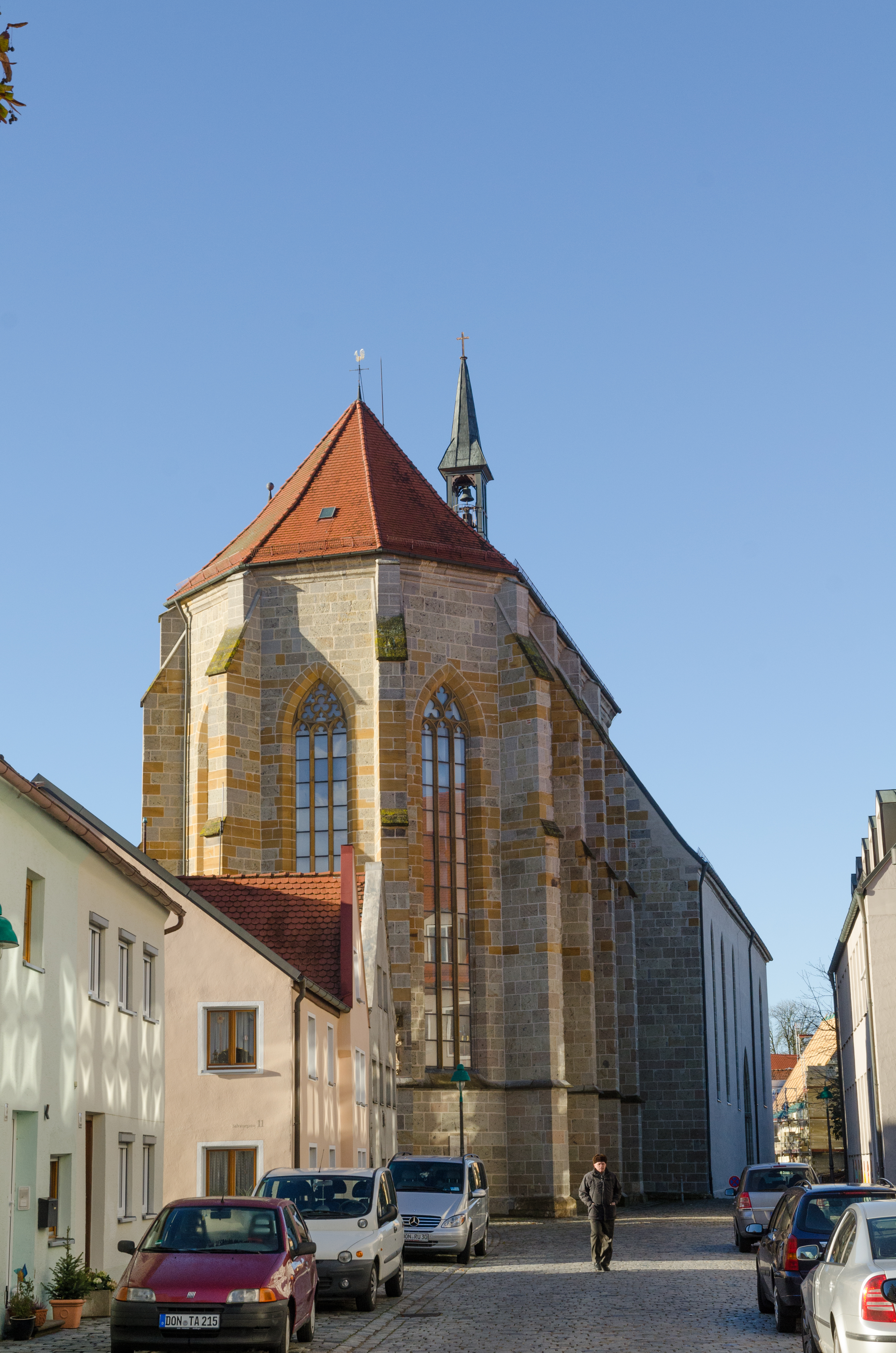
St. Salvator's Church exterior, Nördlingen, Germany

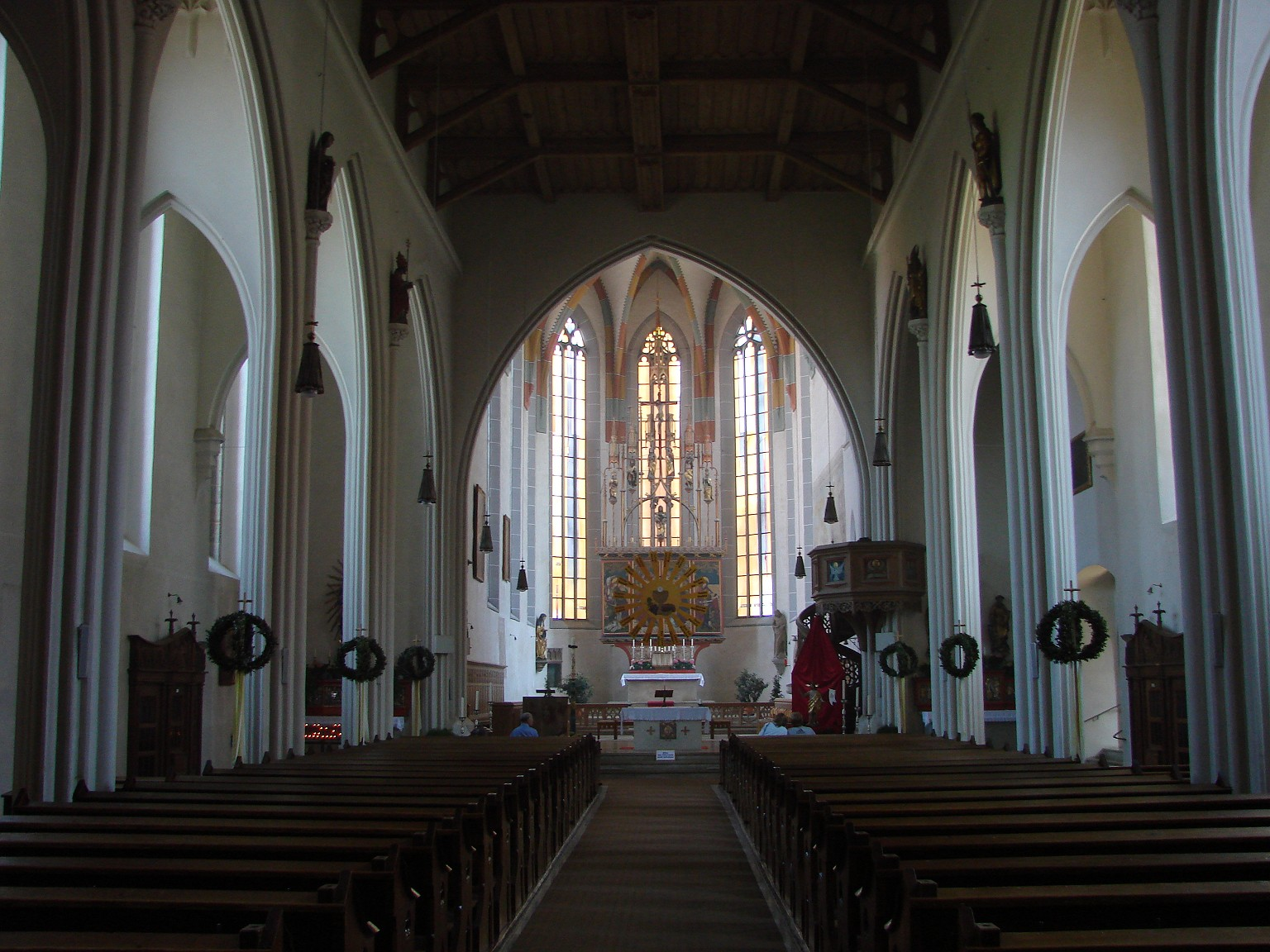
St. Salvator's Church nave, Nördlingen, Germany

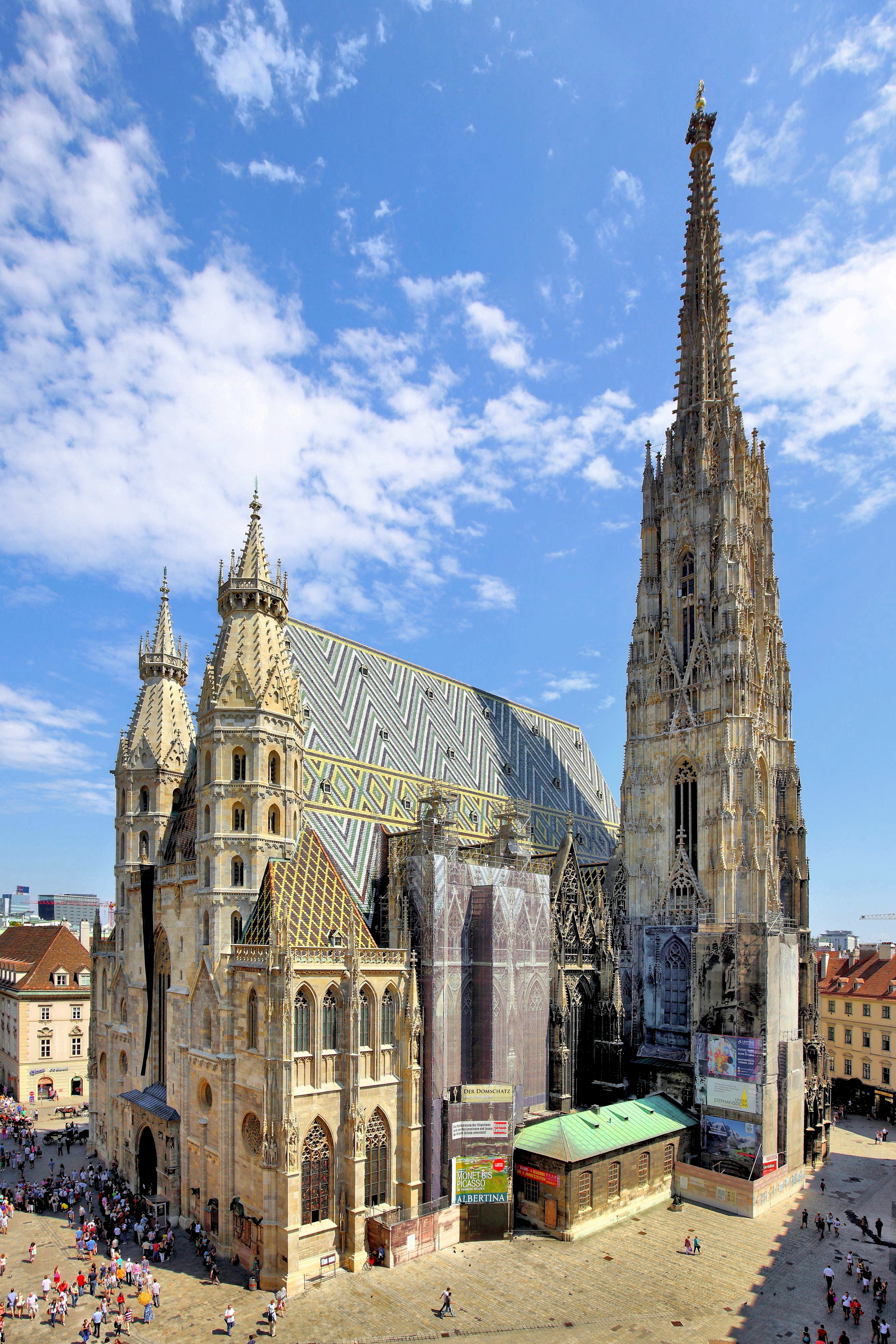
St. Stephen's Cathedral, Vienna, with its prominent South Tower originally developed by Wenzel Parler.
