= Heinrich Parler =

Heinrich Parler the Elder Heinrich von Gemünd der Ältere
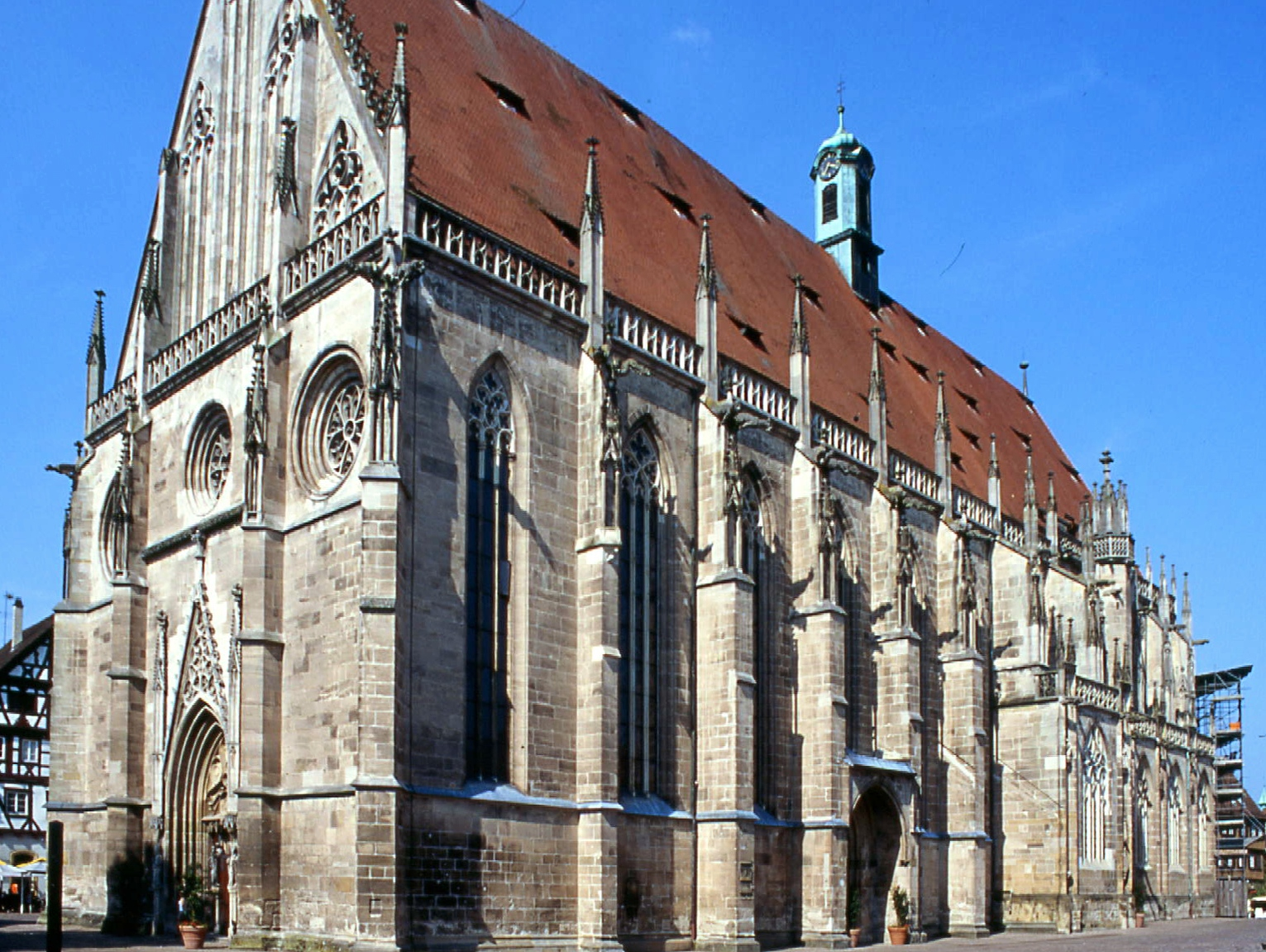
- Holy Cross Minster, Schwäbisch Gmünd, Germany. Masterpiece of Heinrich Parler.
- Born: c. 1310–1320; Cologne, Free City of the Holy Roman Empire
- Died: c. 1370; Schwäbisch Gmünd, Holy Roman Empire
- Occupation: Architect
- Children: Johann Parler the Elder; Michael Parler; Peter Parler
- Buildings: Holy Cross Minster; Nuremberg Frauenkirche
- Design: Late Gothic

Heinrich Parler the Elder (also Heinrich of Gmünd, German: Heinrich von Gemünd der Ältere; c. 1310 – c. 1370), was a German architect and sculptor. His masterpiece is Holy Cross Minster, an influential milestone of late Gothic architecture in the town of Schwäbisch Gmünd, Baden-Württemberg, Germany. Parler also founded the Parler family of master builders and his descendants worked in various parts of central Europe, especially Bohemia. His son, Peter Parler, became one of the major architects of the Middle Ages. The family name is derived from the word Parlier, meaning "foreman".

== Life and work ==
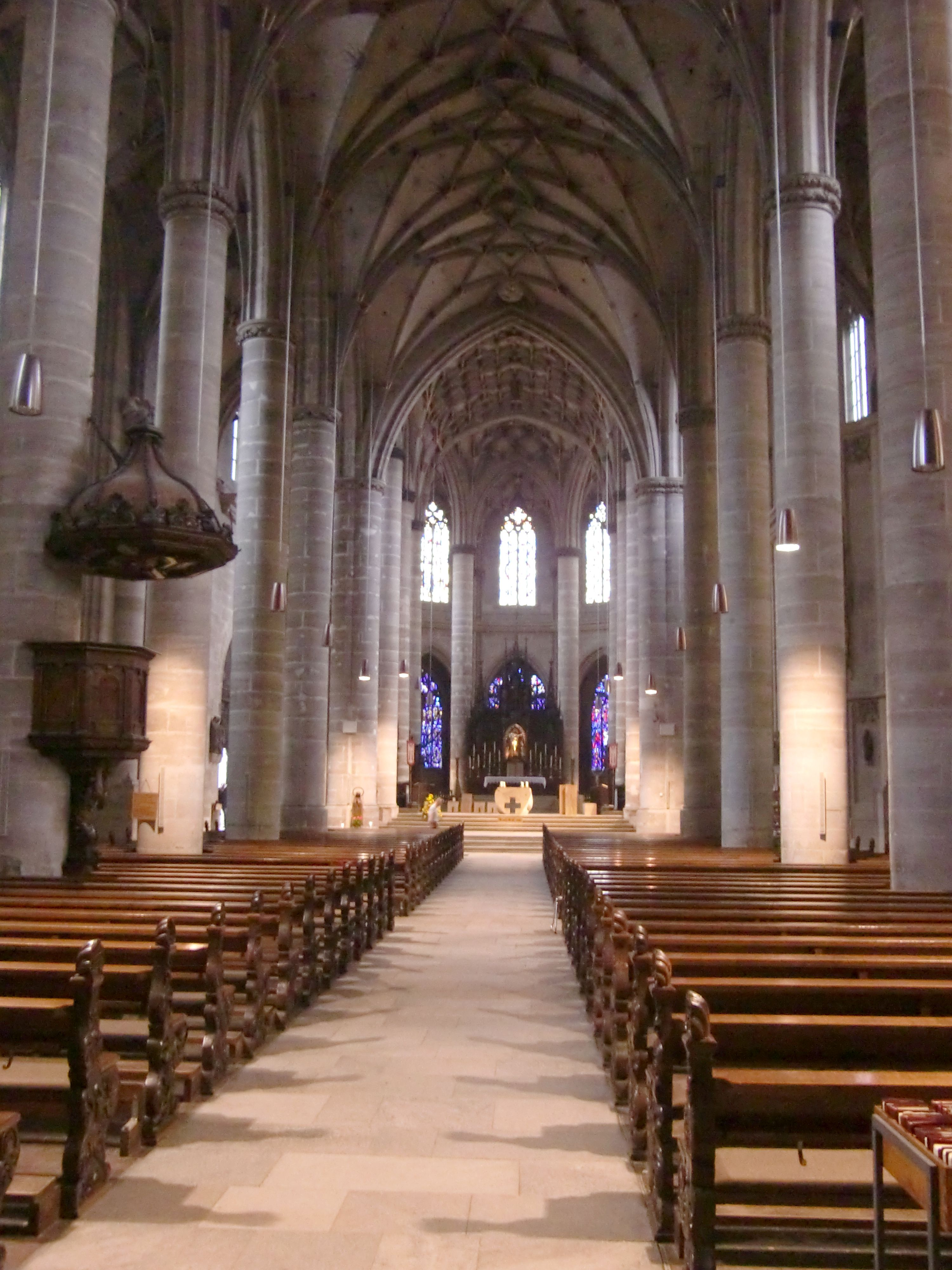
Nave of Holy Cross Minster

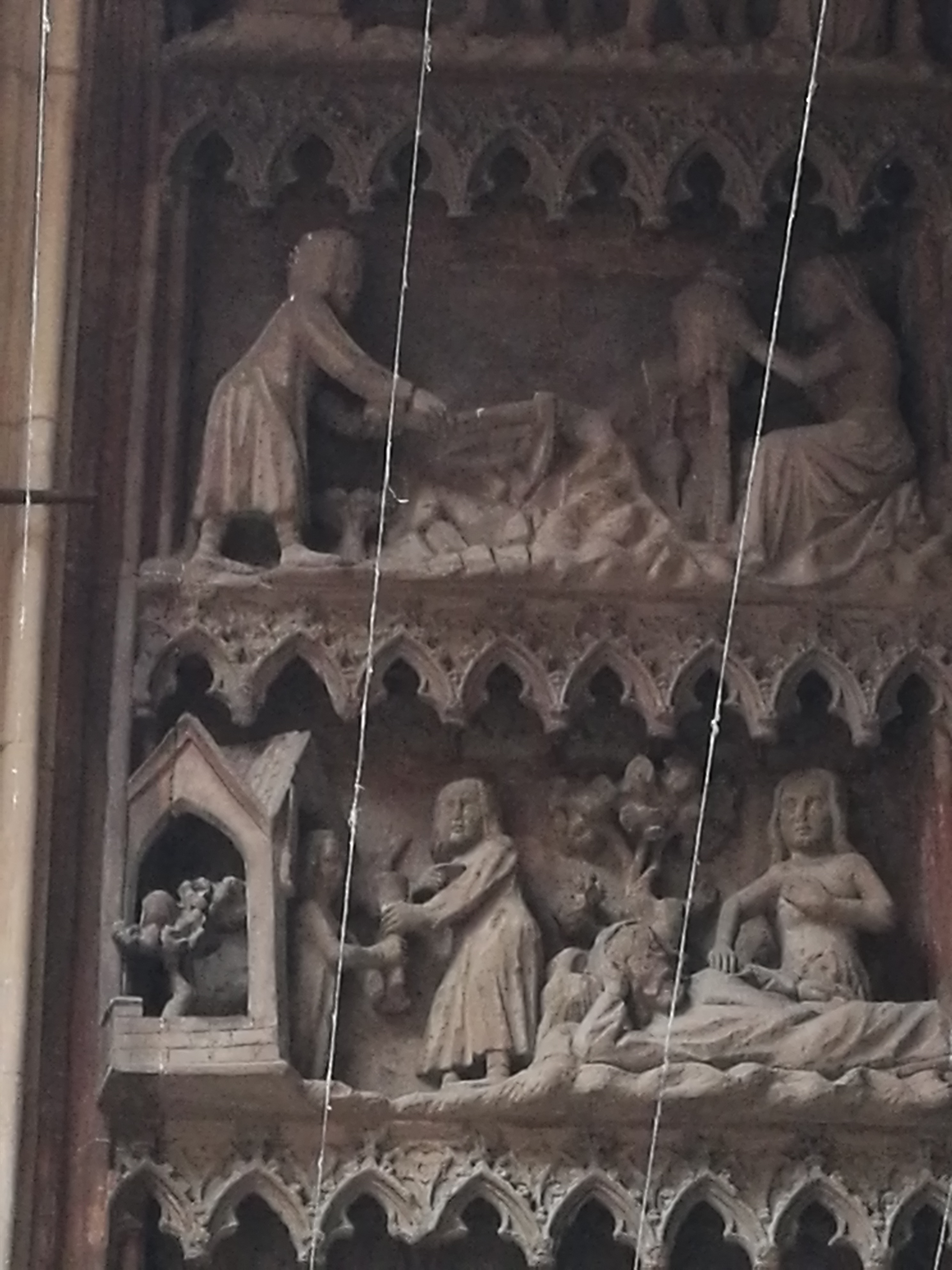
Choir of Holy Cross Minster, showing "Parler style" sculptural details depicting the Old Testament

Heinrich Parler was probably born in Cologne between 1300 and 1310, where his earliest known work was supervising the construction of Cologne Cathedral. He later lived and worked in Gmünd, an Imperial City (German: Reichsstädte) of the Holy Roman Empire.

Sometime around 1333, Parler was invited to become construction manager of the Holy Cross Minster (German: Heilig-Kreuz-Münster) in Gmünd. Construction had already begun in 1315 to replace an existing Romanesque church with a Gothic basilica form. He amended the plan of this new building and completed the nave as a hall church (German: Hallenkirche), the first of its kind in southern Germany. Rounded pillars with leaf wreath capitals, elongated tracery windows, and complex colored vaults are the first tangible evidence of his new style, which became even more pronounced with the laying of the foundation stone of the choir in 1351. His son Peter Parler (1333–1399) began working alongside him on the choir, designed as an ambulatory with chapels lying flat between the buttresses. The number of required internal support columns was therefore reduced and the aisles were built as tall as the nave, creating an expanded sense of space. Heinrich Parler was also responsible for experimental, more lifelike sculptures than had hitherto been created in previous churches. Holy Cross therefore marks an important milestone in late Gothic architecture and sculpture. Father and son did not live to see the consecration of the church, which took place in 1410. Work continued into the 16th century.

As was customary, Heinrich the Elder was also responsible for other construction sites in addition to Schwäbisch Gmünd. Although undocumented, he most likely designed the Frauenkirche, Nuremberg working with his son Peter. The relationship between the design of the church is strikingly close to the prototype of Holy Cross Minster. This comparison also applies to the choir of Augsburg Cathedral, begun in 1356. He may also have had a hand in the design of Ulm Minster, begun in 1366 and today the tallest church in the world, although his family members are more clearly documented as carrying forward the work.

== Legacy ==
Heinrich Parler's architectural style and contemporary sculptural designs were taken up by many other masons and further developed, ranking him as one of the most influential craftsman of the 14th century. What became known as the "Parler style" spread across central Europe and can be seen at St. Martin's Church, Landshut; St. Lorenz, Nuremberg; St. George's Minster, Dinkelsbühl; St. Stephen's Cathedral, Vienna; and numerous examples throughout the Hanseatic League from the Netherlands to Poland. Examples can also be found in Scandinavia, such as at St. Mary's, Helsingør, Denmark.

Heinrich Parler's son, Peter Parler, became one of the greatest architects of the Gothic era. Heinrich's eldest son, Johann Parler the Elder, worked as a builder in Zwettl and then at Basel Cathedral. Heinrich could have had a brother, the foreman Peter von Reutlingen, who presumably built the Marienkirche and the Nikolaikirche in Reutlingen, Germany.
