= All Saints Church (Prague Castle) =

Coordinates: 50.09074°N 14.40230°E

- Kostel Všech svatých
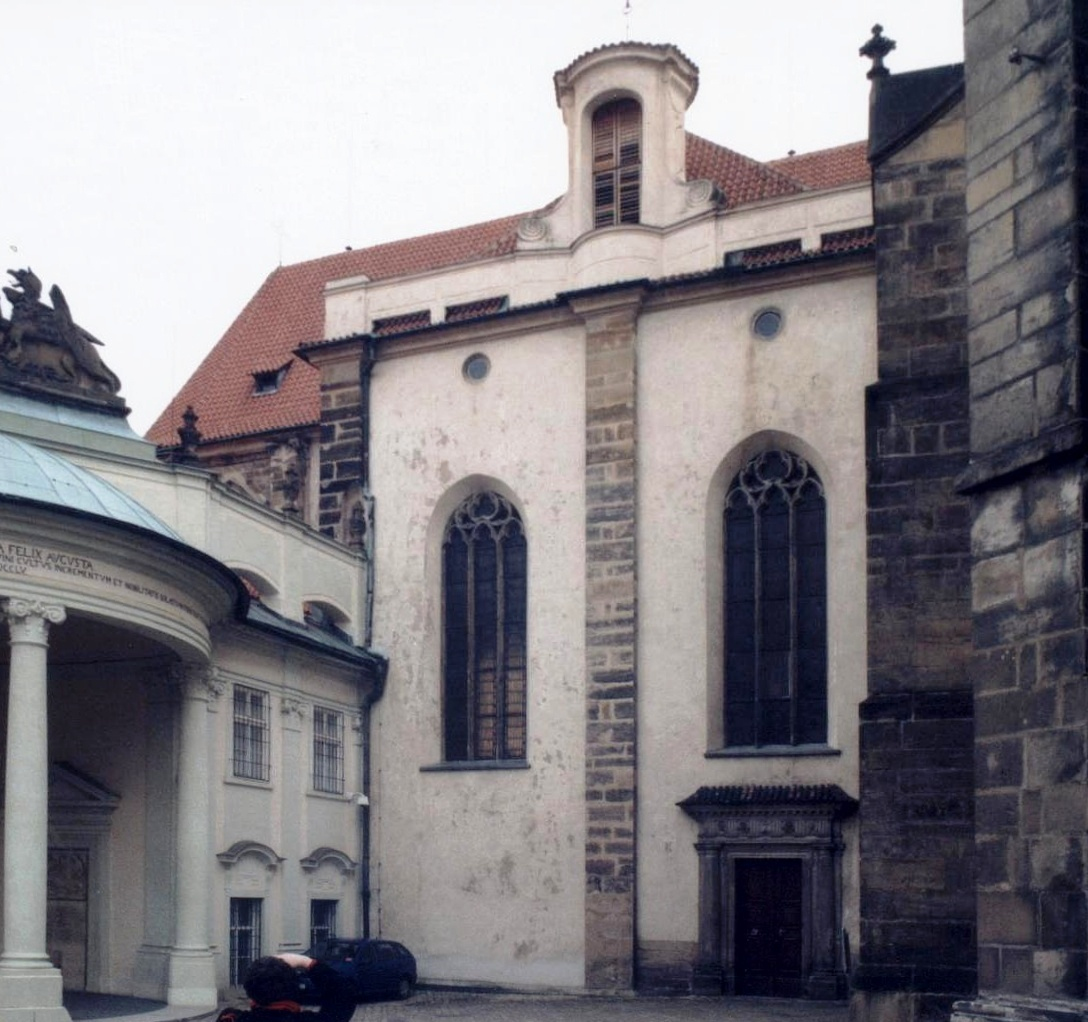
- Exterior of the Church, with the palace to the right
- All Saints Church
- Location: Near Prague Castle
- Country: Czech Republic
- Denomination: Roman Catholic

History
- Status: Open during services and concerts

Architecture
- Functional status: Operational
- Architect: Peter Parler
- Completed: 14th century

All Saints' Church (Czech: Kostel Všech svatých) is a chapel located in the Prague Castle complex in the Czech Republic.

== History ==
The site of the church was originally consecrated in 1185 and a Romanesque building built; the oldest parts of the current building date to a structure constructed by Peter Parler in the 14th century.

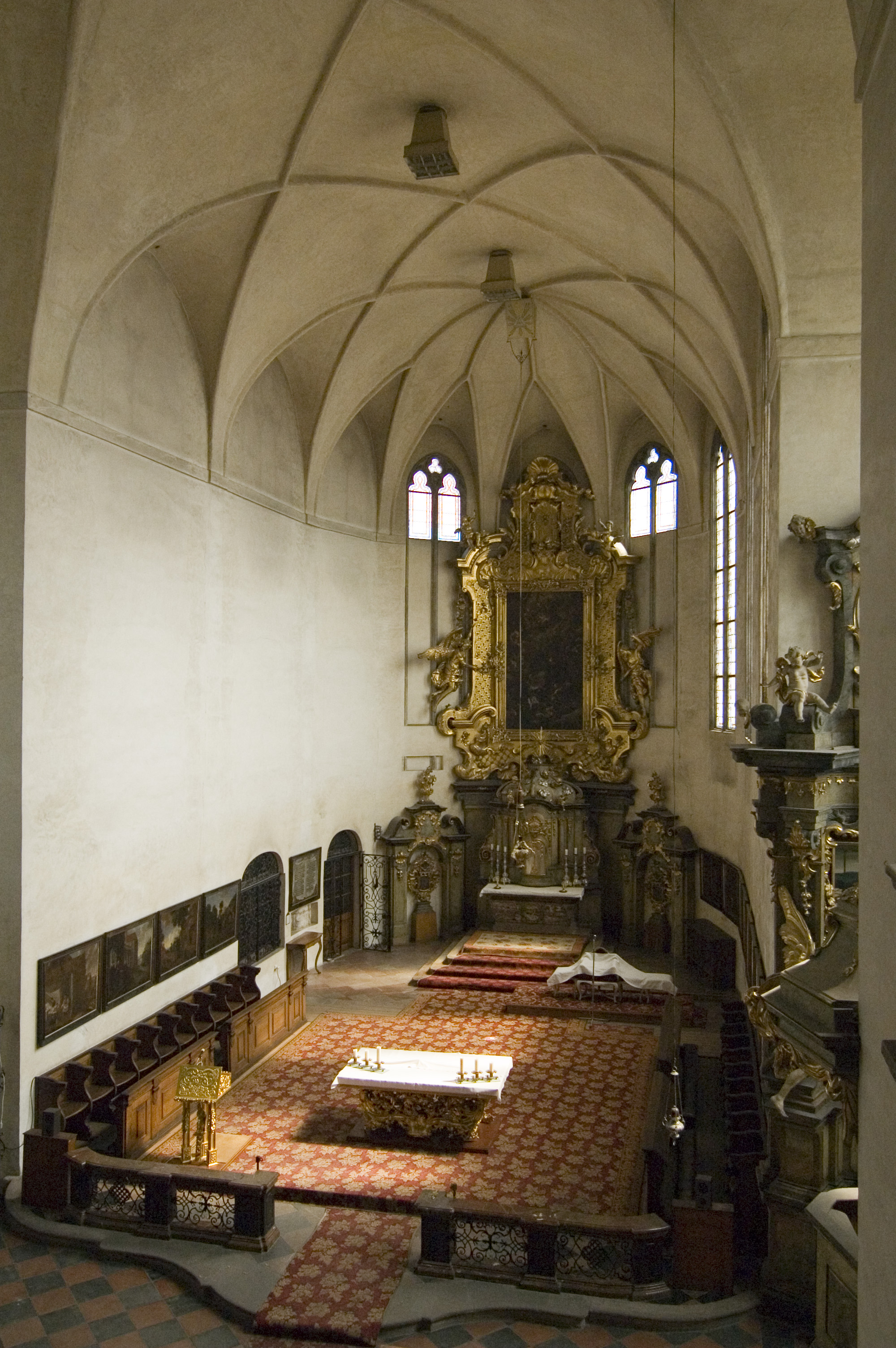
Interior

Although originally free-standing, the church was badly damaged in a 1541 fire which engulfed the palace and church. Through subsequent successive rebuildings and enlargements, the church became physically integrated with the palace, specifically Vladislav Hall.

The church holds the tomb of St. Procopius and his life is depicted on paintings on the walls. Although accessible from Vladislav Hall, the church is generally only open to the public during religious services and concerts.
