= Johann Parler =

Czech architect

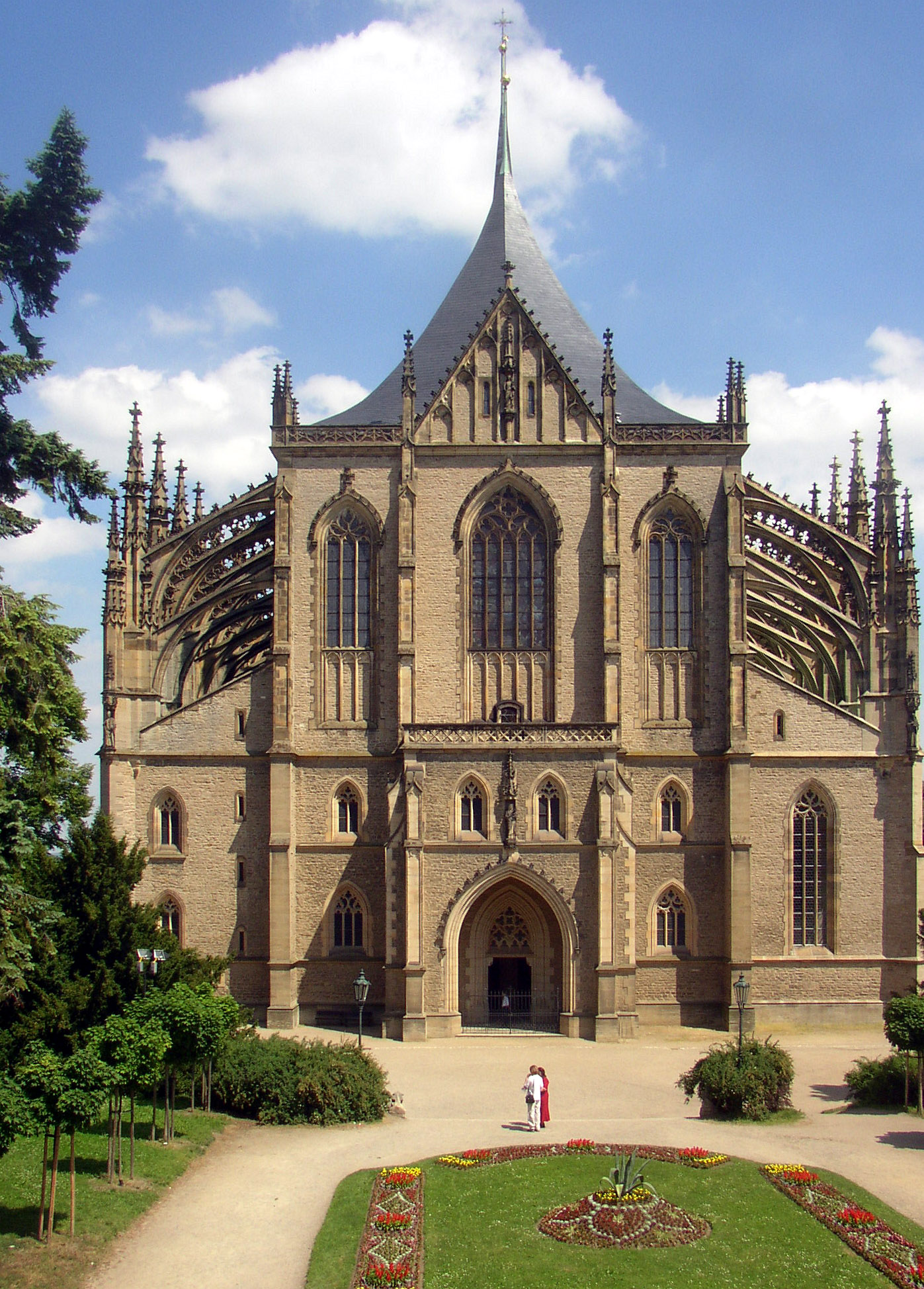
St. Barbara's Church, Kutná Hora

Johann Parler the Younger (Czech: Jan Parléř, German: Johann Parler der Jüngere, [ˈjan ˈparlɛːr̝̊]; c. 1359 – 1405/06), was a Bohemian architect of German origin from the prominent Parler family of architects, master builders, and sculptors. He was the son of famous Gothic architect Peter Parler, the builder of Saint Vitus Cathedral and Charles Bridge in Prague. His uncle (i.e. Peter’s brother) was Johannes von Gmünd also known as Johann Parler the Elder, a German Gothic master builder who was architect of Freiburg Minster and also rebuilt the damaged Basel Minster.

Johann Parler was born in Prague where he received his education. He worked alongside his father and older brother Wenzel Parler on St. Vitus. In 1398, he was first mentioned as the cathedral's master builder (German: Dombaumeister). After his father died in 1399, Johann continued work on St. Vitus Cathedral. He oversaw construction of the South Tower and was probably the designer of the tracery balustrade, which completes the facade.

He then moved to Kutná Hora (German: Kuttenburg), where he became master builder of St. Barbara's Church. He was the first architect of the church, construction of which had already been started in 1388 but interrupted. He is the principal designer of the choir. The design of the closed wall that surrounds the choir chapels and the triangular buttresses standing in the central axis clearly follow the Parler family tradition, which became known as the "Parler style." The late Gothic Cathedral is now listed as a UNESCO World Heritage Site.
