= Parler family =

Family of German architects and sculptors

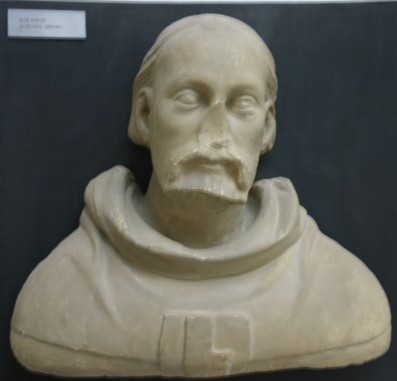
Peter Parler

The Parler family (Czech: Parléř [ˈparlɛːr̝̊]) was a family of German architects and sculptors from the 14th century. Founder of the dynasty, Heinrich Parler, but later lived and worked in Gmünd. His descendants were working in various parts of central Europe, especially in Bohemia. The family name was derived from the word Parlier, meaning "foreman".

Notable members of the family include:

- Heinrich Parler (c. 1300 – c. 1370), also known as Heinrich of Gmünd, founder of the dynasty, father of Johannes, Peter and Michael.
  - Johannes von Gmünd (Johann Parler the Elder) (1330-po 1359), oldest son of Heinrich Parler, father of Heinrich IV. Parler and Michael Parler II (c. 1350 - 1387/88), foreman at the Strasbourg Cathedral
    - Heinrich IV. Parler (Henricus Parlerius, Heinrich Parler the younger), sculptor, founder of the International Gothic style in Prague and Moravia (1373-1390)
  - Peter Parler (1332–1399) (Czech: Petr Parléř), son of Heinrich, brother of Michael
    - Wenzel Parler (Czech: Václav Parléř), son of Peter
    - Johann Parler (Czech: Jan Parléř), son of Peter, brother of Wenzel
