= Peter Parler =

14th-century German architect and sculptor

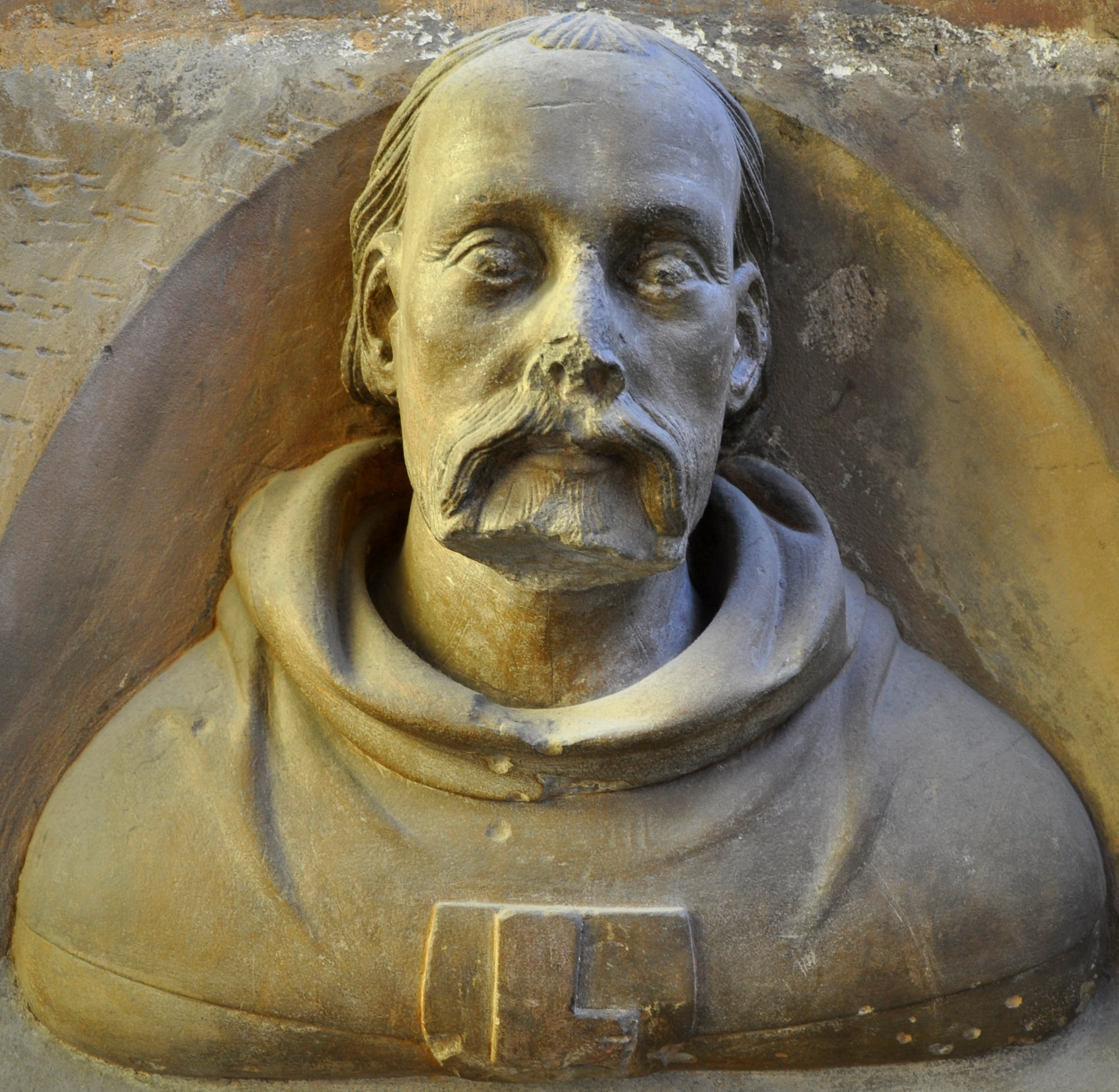
- Self-portrait in stone at St. Vitus Cathedral, c. 1370
- Born: 1333; Schwäbisch Gmünd, Holy Roman Empire
- Died: 13 July 1399 (aged 68–69); Prague, Kingdom of Bohemia, Holy Roman Empire
- Other names: Peter von Gemünd; Petr Parléř
- Occupation: Architect
- Children: Johann Parler; Wenzel Parler
- Parent: Heinrich Parler the Elder
- Buildings: Frauenkirche; St. Vitus Cathedral; Charles Bridge
- Design: Late Gothic

Peter Parler (German: Peter von Gemünd, Czech: Petr Parléř, Latin: Petrus de Gemunden in Suevia; 1333 – 13 July 1399) was a German-Bohemian architect and sculptor from the Parler family of master builders. Along with his father, Heinrich Parler, he is one of the most prominent and influential craftsmen of the Middle Ages. Born and apprenticed in the town of Schwäbisch Gmünd, Peter worked at several important late Medieval building sites, including Strasbourg, Cologne, and Nuremberg. After 1356 he lived in Prague, capital of the Kingdom of Bohemia and seat of the Holy Roman Empire, where he created his most famous works: St. Vitus Cathedral and the Charles Bridge.

== Early life ==
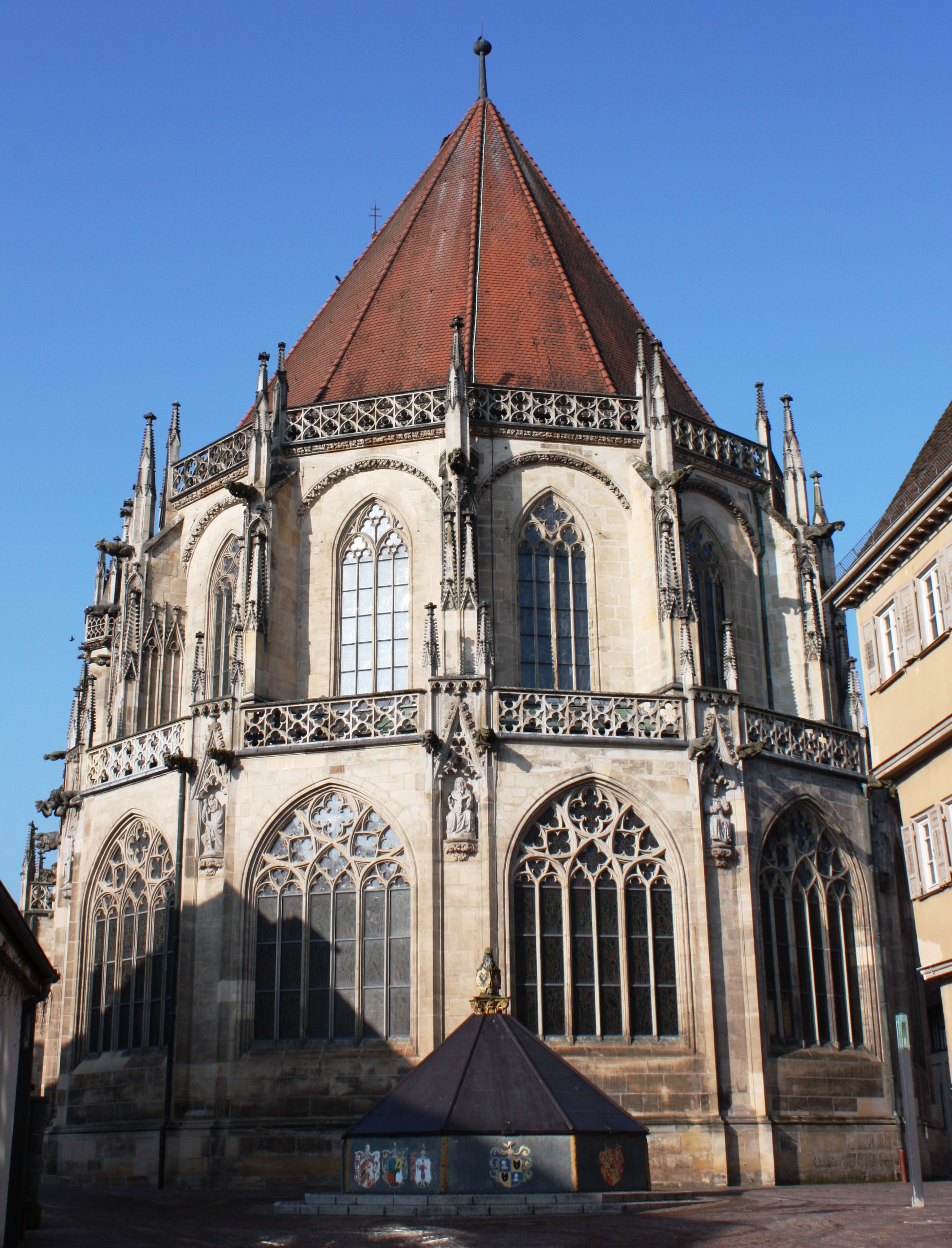
The choir of Holy Cross Minster, Schwäbisch Gmünd, Germany

Little is known about the earliest youth of Peter Parler. His father, Heinrich Parler the Elder, was a stonemason at Cologne Cathedral. Around 1333, when Peter was born, Heinrich was invited by the free imperial city of Schwäbisch Gmünd to take over construction of a large new parish church, Holy Cross Minster. Peter was already working alongside his father on the church when the cornerstone of the choir was laid in 1351. This is presumably also where his apprenticeship was completed. The division of the choir by a continuous balustrade demonstrates what would become his trademark style. The arched section at the southern portal of the church can also be attributed to Peter. The designs developed by the father and son team at Holy Cross were unique and mark an important milestone in late Gothic architecture and sculpture.

Peter then set off on his German: Wanderjahre as a wandering journeyman. On these visits he learned the most important concepts of Gothic construction techniques in Central Europe. He visited Cologne, perhaps Paris, and certainly spent time in Strasbourg – precise knowledge of Strasbourg Cathedral can be seen in his subsequent buildings. While working in Cologne he met Druda (Gertrud), daughter of the resident architect Bartholomäus von Hamm. They eventually married and had four children: three sons, of which two went on to become known master builders in their own right, and a daughter.

While undocumented, some scholars believe Parler traveled to England during this period, while others find the possibility unlikely. The idea arises because certain detailed and concealed technical devices appear in his later work which could have only been obtained through first-hand experience and not from any architectural drawings. What is definitely known is that masons at Strasbourg implemented specific craft methods from western England in the late 1200s, which points to knowledge of English Gothic architectural methods in the Rhineland. Since Peter Parler spent time working at Strasbourg, it is much more likely his knowledge of these methods came from there. In particular, the vaults he later designed at St. Vitus Cathedral were most probably modeled after the St. Catherine Chapel of Strasbourg Cathedral.

== Nuremberg ==
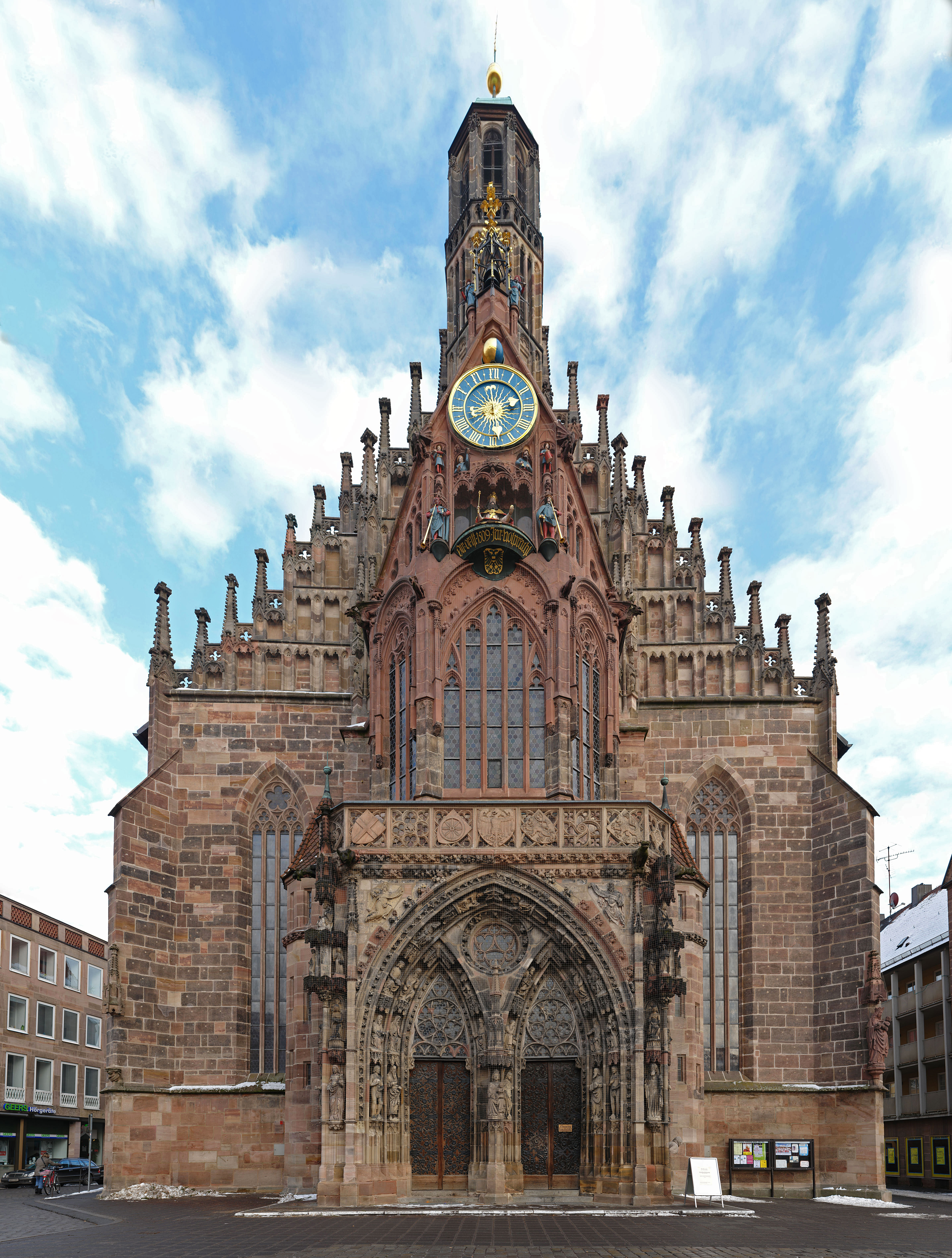
Frauenkirche, Nuremberg, Germany, where the first sculpture by Peter Parler can be directly identified (1352–1356)

Sometime after 1352 Peter joined the construction works at the Frauenkirche in Nuremberg as the parlier, or chief site assistant alongside his father. The exact date and his precise role are unclear. The foundations of the church had already been laid in 1351 on the initiative of Charles IV, Holy Roman Emperor, who envisioned it as a center for holding imperial ceremonies. This is reflected in the carved coats of arms of the Emperor, the seven Prince-electors, and the city of Rome where the Holy Roman Emperors were crowned. Here the first sculptures can be directly ascribed to Peter, among them a prominent figure of Zacharias.

Charles also commissioned the building of Wenzelsburg Castle at Lauf an der Pegnitz, near Nuremberg. Built on the ruins of an older castle, its ambitious architecture can be directly connected to the Parlers and Peter probably worked there as a sculptor. By 1355 their sophisticated style had come to the attention of Charles IV and Peter was called to work in Prague, the capitol of the new Kingdom of Bohemia and seat of the Emperor. The year of this appointment is not entirely clear since the documentary inscription in Prague was partially painted over in the 15th century. Today research usually sets the date to 1356, which accounts for a pause in construction in both Nuremberg and Prague, as well as information that he was at least 23 years old at the time of his appointment.

== Prague ==
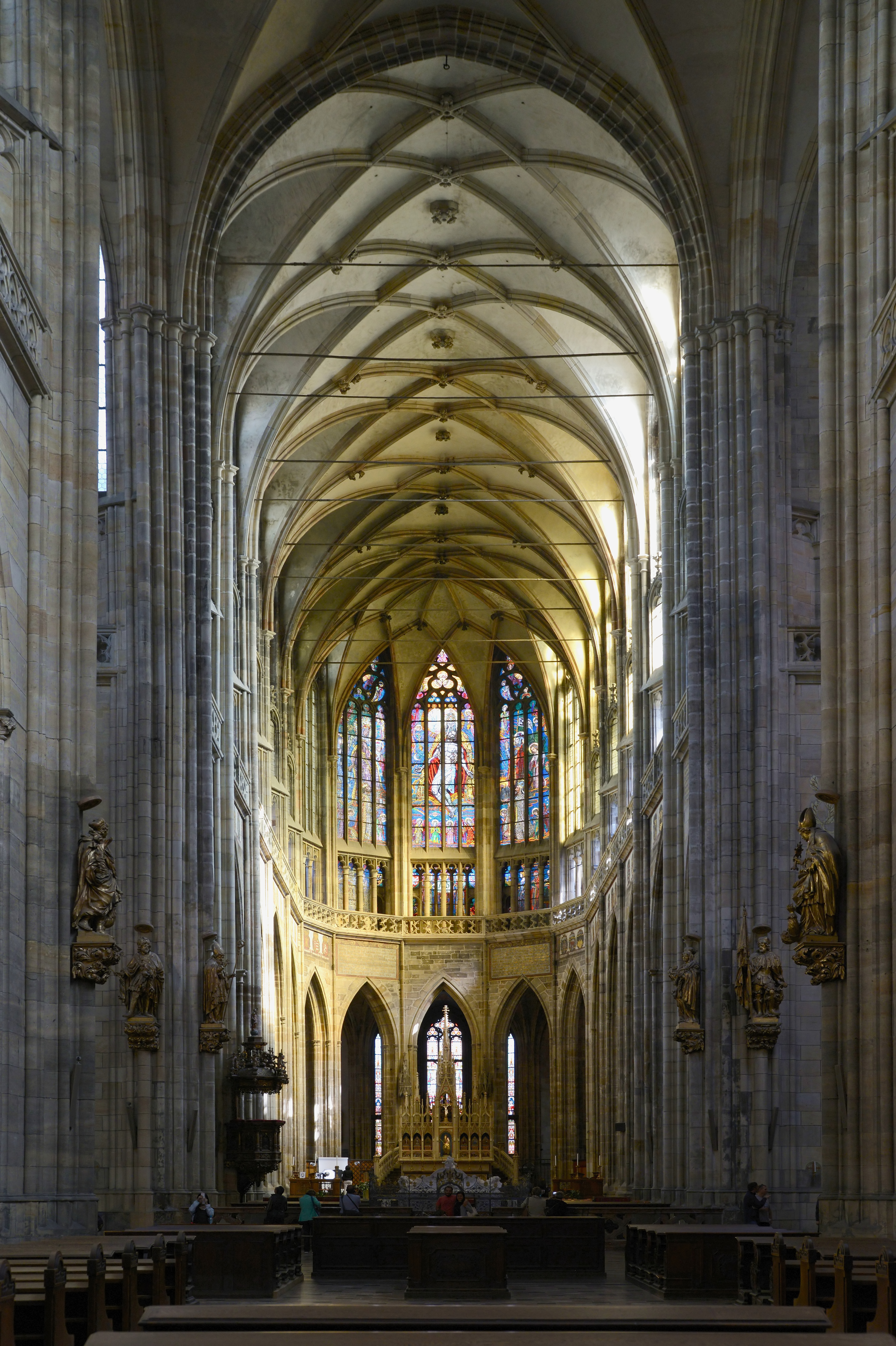
Interior of St. Vitus Cathedral, clearly showing the Parler-style balustrade

Upon his ascension to the throne as King of Bohemia in 1347, Charles IV established his capital at Prague. At the time it consisted of two autonomous Medieval towns on each side of the Vltava river (German: Moldau): the Old Town on the right and the Lesser Town with Prague Castle above it on the left. In 1348 he ordered construction of the New Town adjacent to the existing Old Town, founded Charles University, began reconstruction of the castle, and restarted work on the cathedral. To accomplish this ambitious building program he recruited the best architects he could find. First was Matthias of Arras, who died in 1352. When elected Holy Roman Emperor in 1355, Charles determined to make Prague the showcase capital of Central Europe and recruited Peter Parler to execute this grand vision. The period would launch what became known as Prague's "golden era" and it soon was the largest European city after Constantinople, Paris, and Granada.

=== St. Vitus Cathedral ===
When Peter arrived in Prague in 1356 at the age of 23, his immediate assignment was to take over the construction site at St. Vitus Cathedral, which had languished since the death of Matthias of Arras in 1352. It is indicative of Peter's talents that the most important building in the Empire was then entrusted to such a young architect. Peter continued the works at St. Vitus from the ambulatory and chapels, which were partially complete, and gradually changed the Matthias plan while keeping continual references to the original vision.

=== Charles Bridge ===
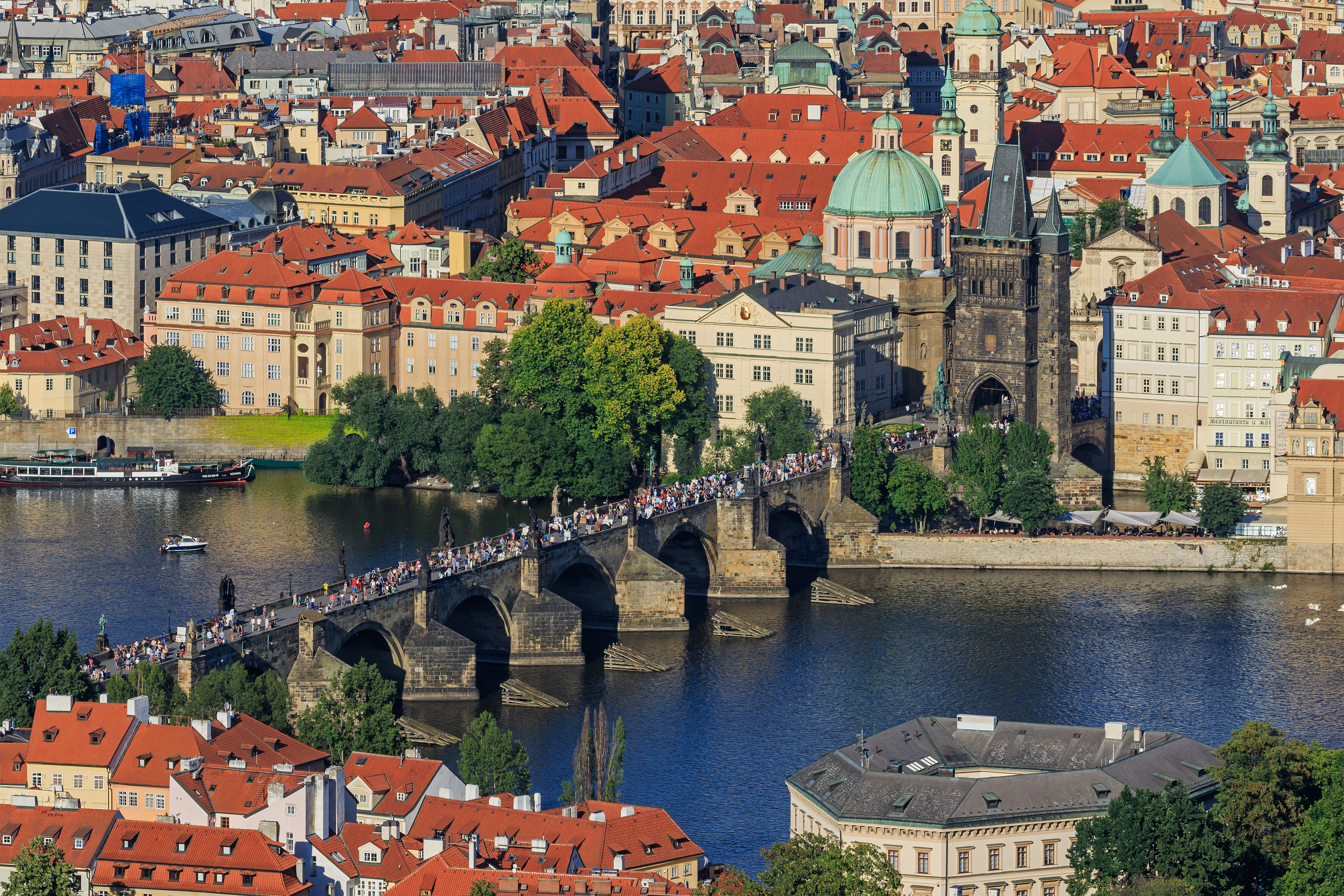
Charles Bridge and the Old Town Bridge Tower

In 1342, just prior to the reign of Charles IV, the Romanesque Judith Bridge across the Vltava was severely damaged in a flood. It had been the first stone bridge to connect each bank of the river. In 1357, Charles commissioned Peter to build a new structure to reconnect the growing city, now consisting of 4 districts. The first foundation stone was ceremonially laid in the presence of the Emperor on 9 July 1357 at 5:31 am. The exact time is known because the architect had the palindromic number 135797531 carved into the bridge's tower, having been chosen by the royal astrologists as the most auspicious for starting construction. Due to the complexity of the engineering project, and the large number of other projects underway, construction lasted until 1402.

The east tower of the Bridge, Old Town Bridge Tower, was also built by Peter Parler. Its arch contains a net vault that was the first of its kind in Bohemia.

=== Other works ===
Apart from the cathedral and the bridge, Peter was also the main designer of the New Town of Prague. He also built the All Saints' Chapel inside the Royal Palace of Prague Castle. After a fire in 1541 it was redecorated in the Baroque style. Between 1360–78 Parler built the chancel of the St. Bartholomew church in Kolín. Peter is also responsible for various tombs, shrines and sculptures at various sites in and around Prague, including at Kutná Hora.

== Family and personal life ==
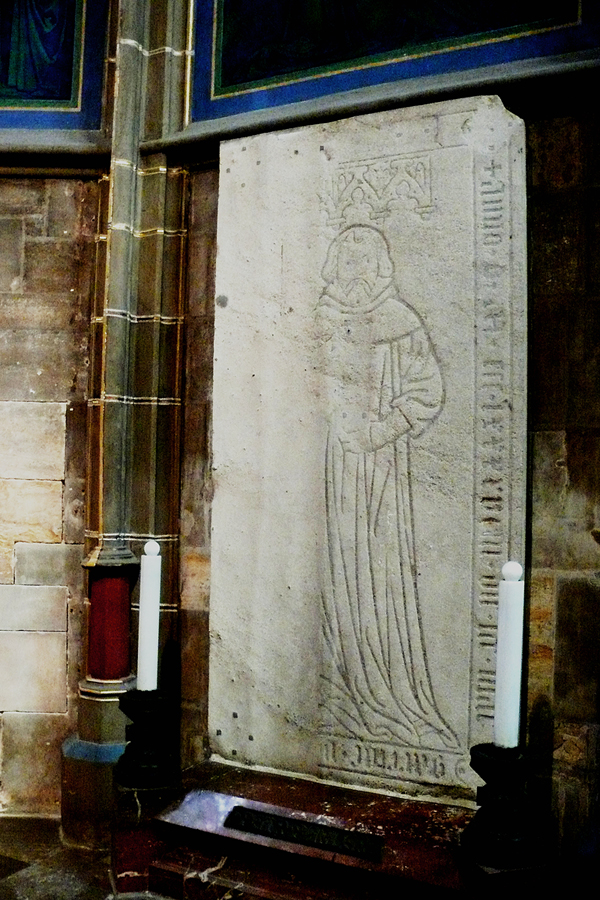
Tombstone of Peter Parler in St. Vitus Cathedral

The Parler family grew large and its many members worked at Gothic construction sites all over Central Europe and Northern Italy. Peter's branch of the family began with his marriage to his first wife, Gertrude. Although their wedding date is not exactly known, by 1360 they were raising three sons and a daughter:

- Johann Parler the Younger: born around 1359, educated in Prague, worked alongside his father on St. Vitus. Johann took over his father's role as the cathedral's master builder in 1398 and also became the master builder of St. Barbara's Church, Kutná Hora, now a UNESCO World Heritage Site.
- Nikolaus Parler: became a clergyman and served as a canon in Prague from 1380–1398. Little else is known about him.
- Wenzel Parler: born around 1360, also educated in Prague, worked with both his father and brother Johann at St. Vitus through the 1390s. He then went on to become master stonemason at St. Stephen's Cathedral, Vienna.
- Their daughter appears around 1383 as the wife of a Michael from Cologne, possibly the son of another cathedral architect named Michael (1364–1387).

After 1360, Peter owned a house in Prague Castle Square and had been elected city alderman. His first wife Gertrude died in the late 1360s and he returned to Cologne to dispose of her inheritance in 1370. He then married Elisabeth Agnes von Bur in 1380 and in the same year bought a second house on Castle Square. From this marriage two more children were born: Johann, who possibly became a stonemason in Zagreb; and Paul, about whom no information survives. He may have had other children as well. The purchase of the houses, the marriage of his daughter, and the number of his children led to some legal disputes. Peter Parler is known to have relinquished both houses to his second wife and their children.

Peter was granted citizenship in Prague in 1379. By his old age he had become a wealthy man and was still active as an architect. His name appears as Cathedral Master (German: Dombaumeister) on a panel at St. Vitus as late as 1396. He died in Prague in 1399 and was buried at St. Vitus Cathedral, with his sons Peter and Wenzel carrying on his work.

== Legacy ==
Peter Parler was one of the most well-known and influential craftsman of the Middle Ages. The designs of both him and his father became known as the "Parler style" and spread throughout Central Europe. Significant examples include: St. Martin's Church, Landshut (begun 1389); St. Lorenz, Nuremberg (nave begun 1400); St. George's Minster, Dinkelsbühl (begun 1448); St. Stephen's Cathedral, Vienna (south tower begun 1368); and numerous other examples across the Hanseatic League from the Netherlands to Poland. Examples can also be found in Scandinavia, such as at St. Mary's, Helsingør, Denmark.

A demonstration of just how far his ideas went can be found at Seville Cathedral, begun in 1402 and today still the largest Gothic cathedral in the world. The standard Gothic verticality of the central space is broken up by a balustrade at the boundary with the clerestory windows. More importantly, the balustrade's widely spaced vertical bars and its position flowing outside of the outermost ribs are exactly like Peter Parler's original design of the western bays at St. Vitus’ Cathedral. Construction at Seville Cathedral continued until 1506.

During the Hussite wars (1419–1434) the lands of the Bohemian Crown were totally ravaged. Although his buildings still stand, much of Peter Parler's sculptural works were destroyed. A portrait of him, carved out of his hand, remains in the Domgalerie at St. Vitus Cathedral.

=== Asteroid ===
An Asteroid named in honor of Peter Parler, 6550 Parléř, was discovered by Antonín Mrkos at Kleť Observatory on 4 November 1988.

=== Parler Prize ===
The "Peter Parler Prize" was established in 1994 by the German Foundation for Monument Protection (German: Deutsche Stiftung Denkmalschutz) and the Federal Association of German Stonemasons (German: Bundesverband Deutscher Steinmetze). It is awarded every two years at the International Exhibition of Natural Stone and Stone Processing in Nuremberg for outstanding service in the preservation of cultural heritage. The prize is accompanied by a commemorative bust of Peter Parler and EUR 15,000. It was most recently awarded in 2015 to August Weber and Helmut Schneider for restoration work at St. George's church in Ulm.

== List of major works ==
=== Buildings in Prague ===
- St. Vitus Cathedral (1356–1396)
  - Chancel, sacristy and tower
  - Chapel of St. Wenceslas
  - Golden Gate
- Charles Bridge (1357–1402)
- Old Town Hall (1360–1381)
  - chapel
  - bay, stone decoration
- Old Town Bridge Tower (1370–1380)
- Church of the Assumption of the Virgin Mary and Charlemagne (consecrated 1377)
- All Saints Church (1372–1386)
- Church of Our Lady before Týn (choir 1380–)
- Karolinum (1383–1386)
  - gothic bay

=== Buildings elsewhere ===
- Heilig-Kreuz-Münster, Schwäbisch Gmünd (?–1351), consecrated 1410.
- Karlštejn Castle (1357–1365)
- St. Bartholomew's Church, Kolín (1360–1378)
- Frauenkirche, Nuremberg (1352–1356)
- Wenzelschloss, Lauf an der Pegnitz (1355–1356)
- St. Barbara's Church, Kutná Hora (begun 1388)

=== Architectural drawings ===
- Peter Parler: Drawing of the choir and western facade of St. Vitus Cathedral (black ink on parchment, 132 x 52.5 cm), Kupferstichkabinett, Akademie der Bildenden Künste, Vienna
- Peter Parler: Drawing of the south tower of St. Vitus Cathedral (black ink on parchment, 106 x 93 cm), Kupferstichkabinett, Akademie der Bildenden Künste, Vienna

== Gallery ==
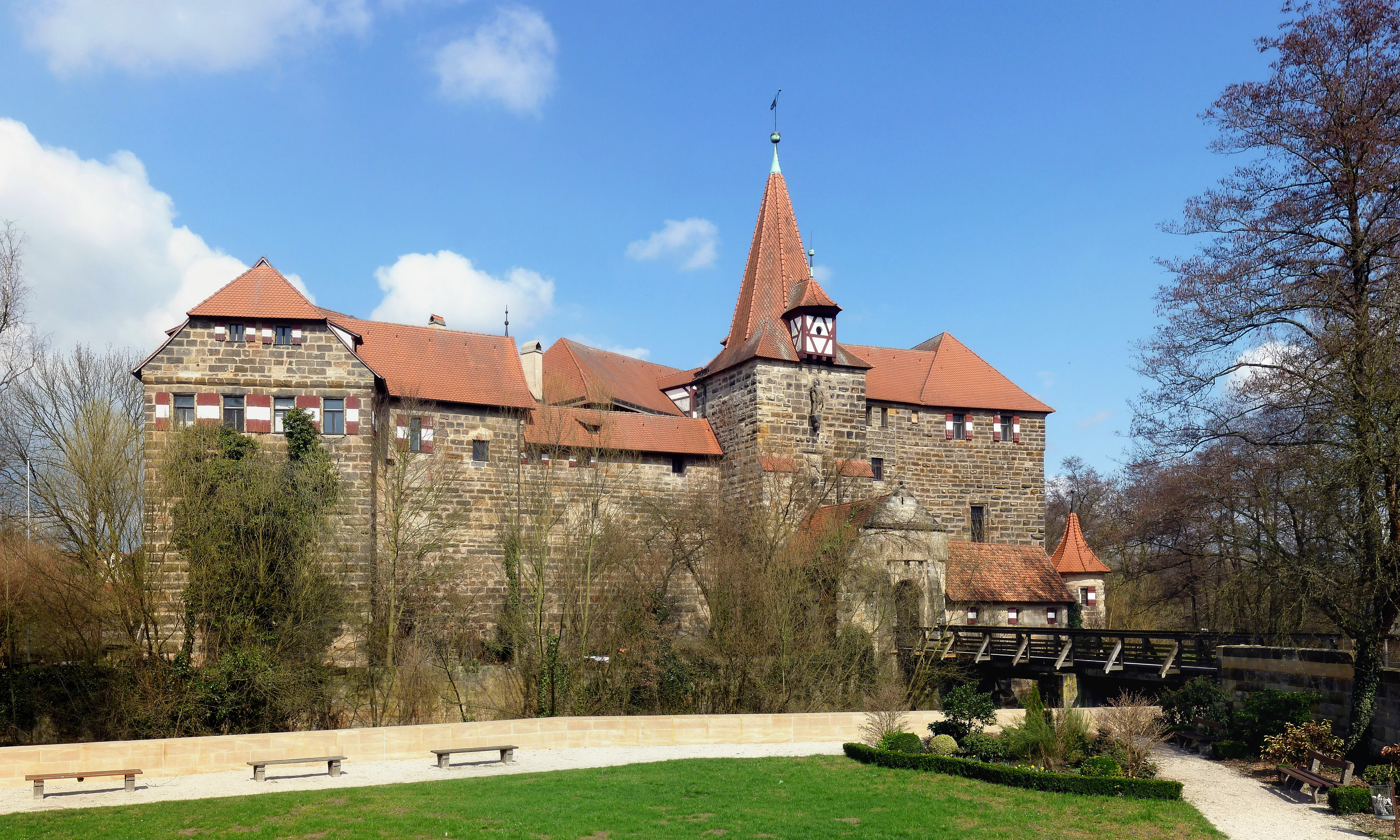
Exterior of Wenzelschloss.

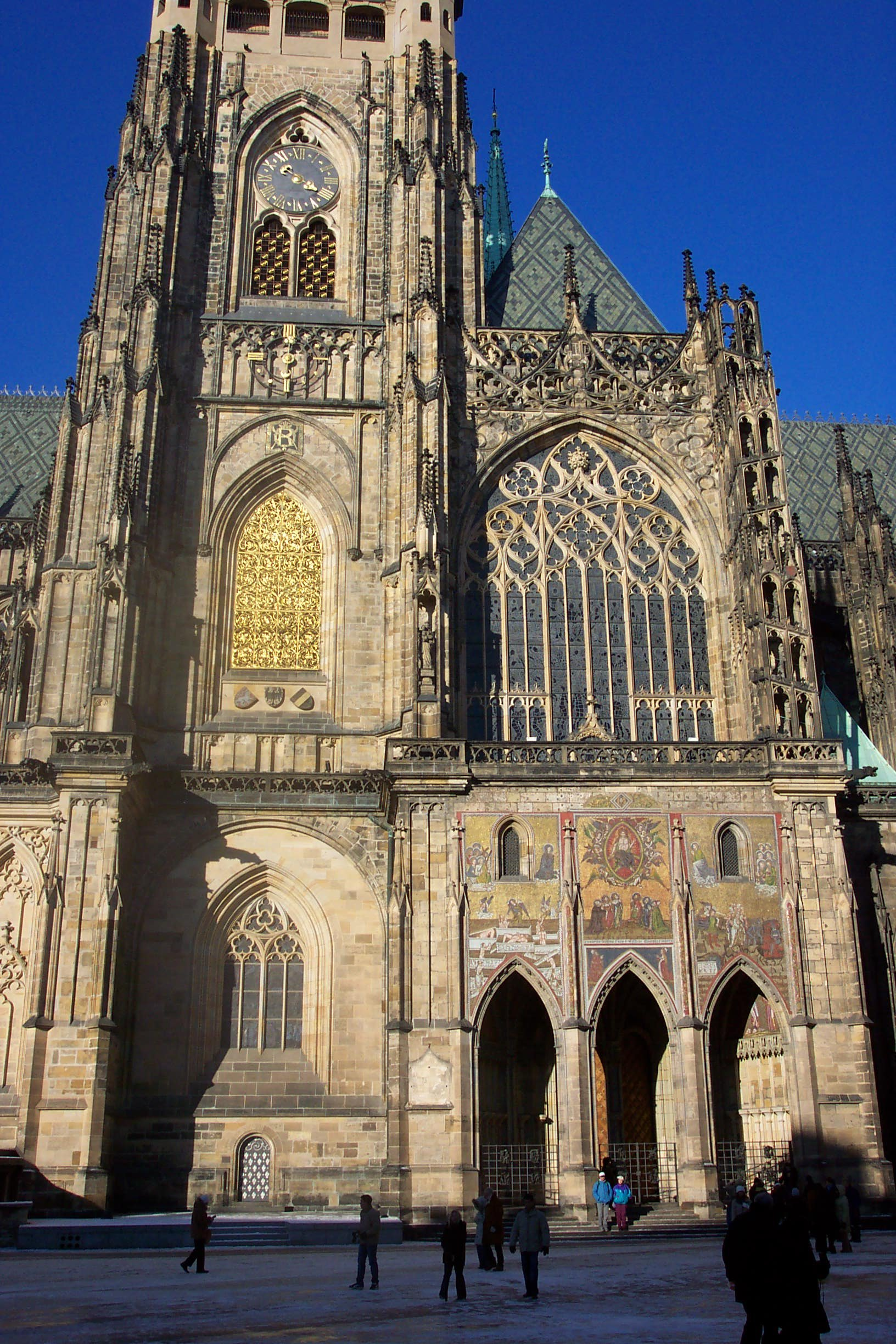
South portal of St. Vitus Cathedral.

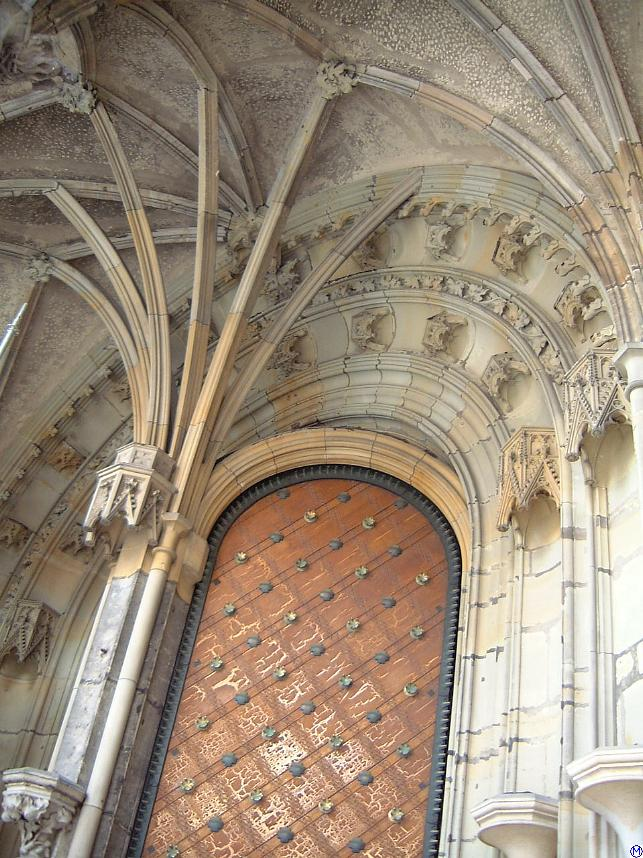
The open "Parler style" tracery at St. Vitus Cathedral

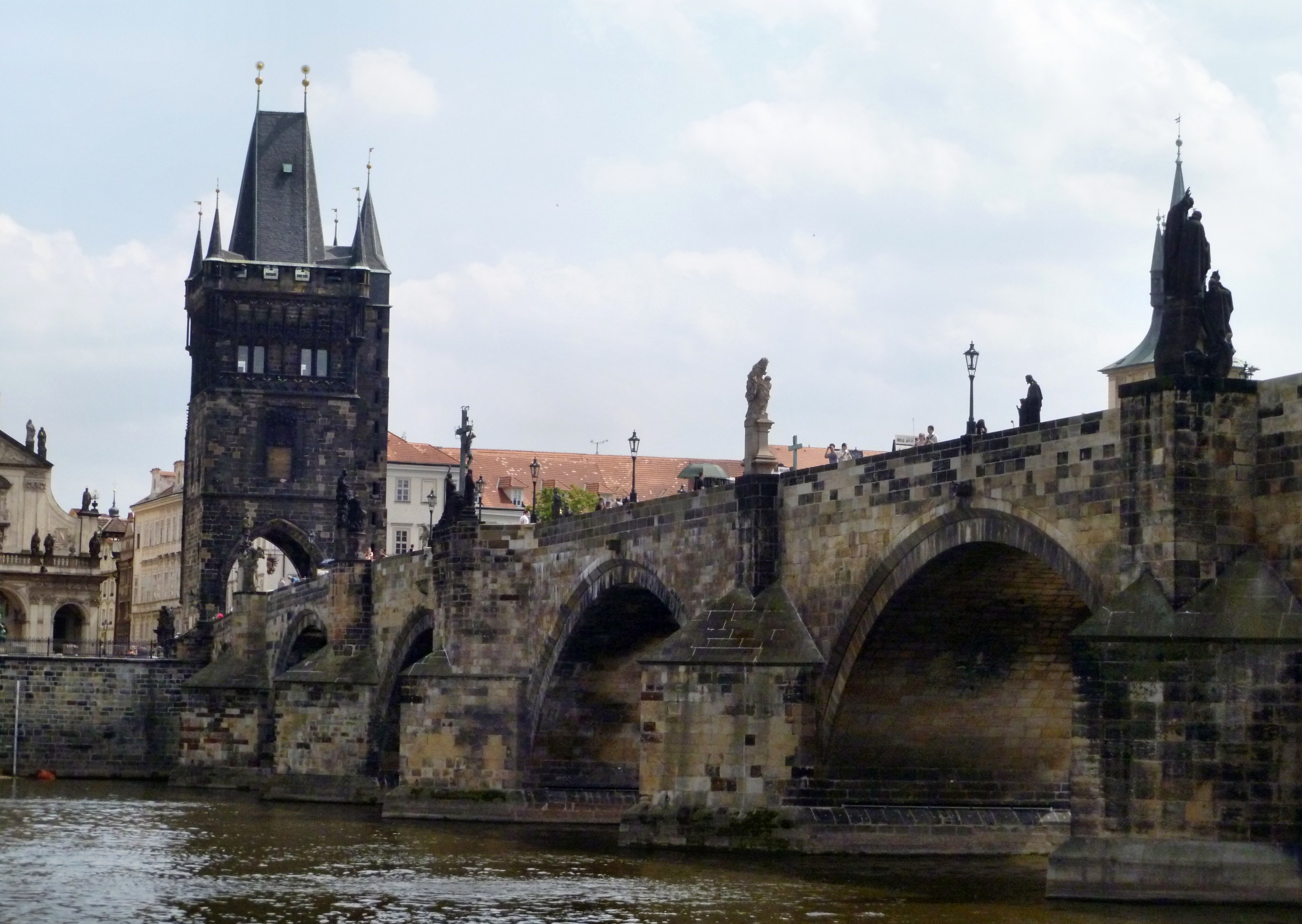
Charles Bridge

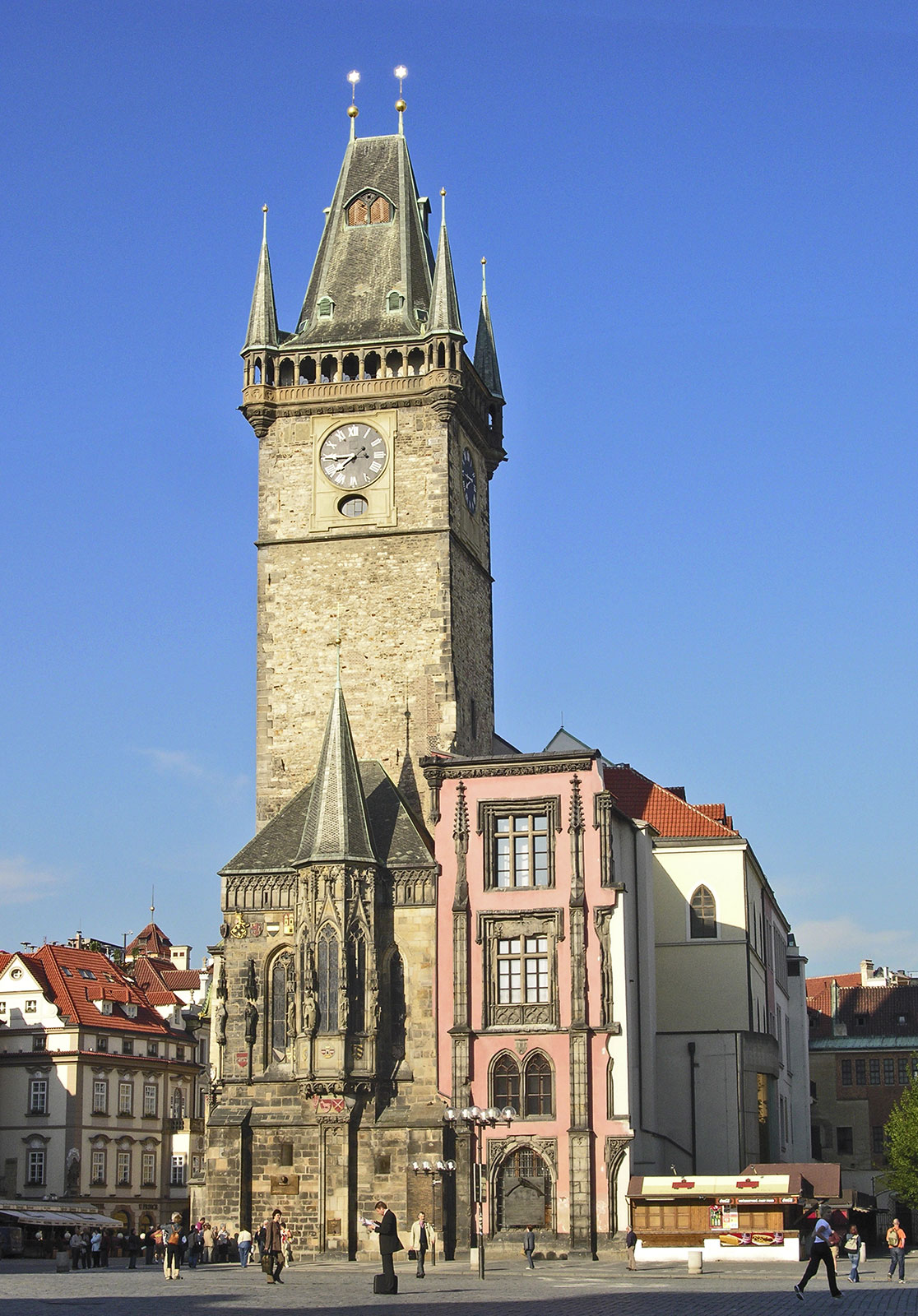
Old Town Hall, Prague

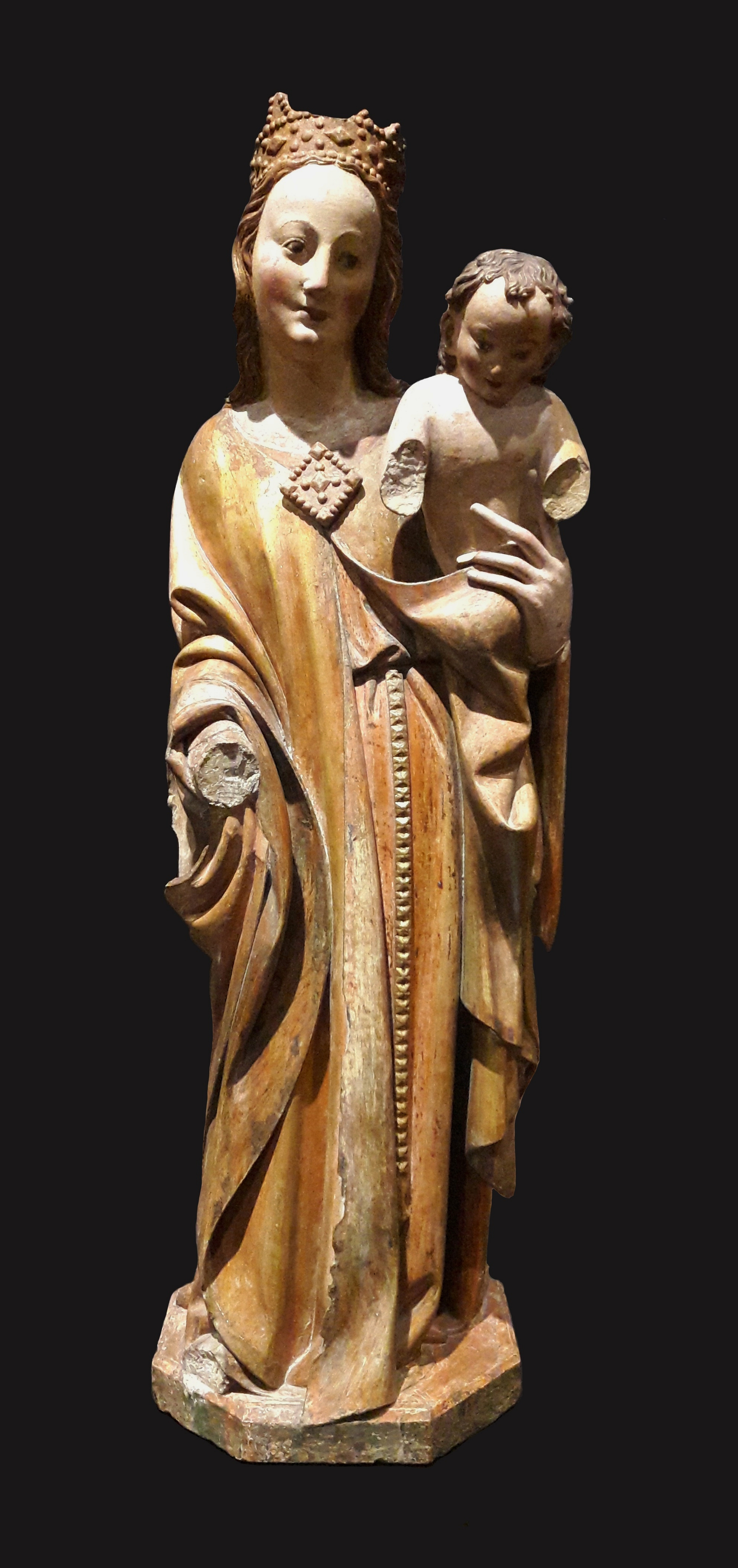
Madonna and Child, sculpture (c. 1375-1380), National Museum, Warsaw

== See also ==
- Parler family
- Czech Gothic architecture
