= St. George's Square (Prague Castle) =

Square at Prague Castle, Czechia

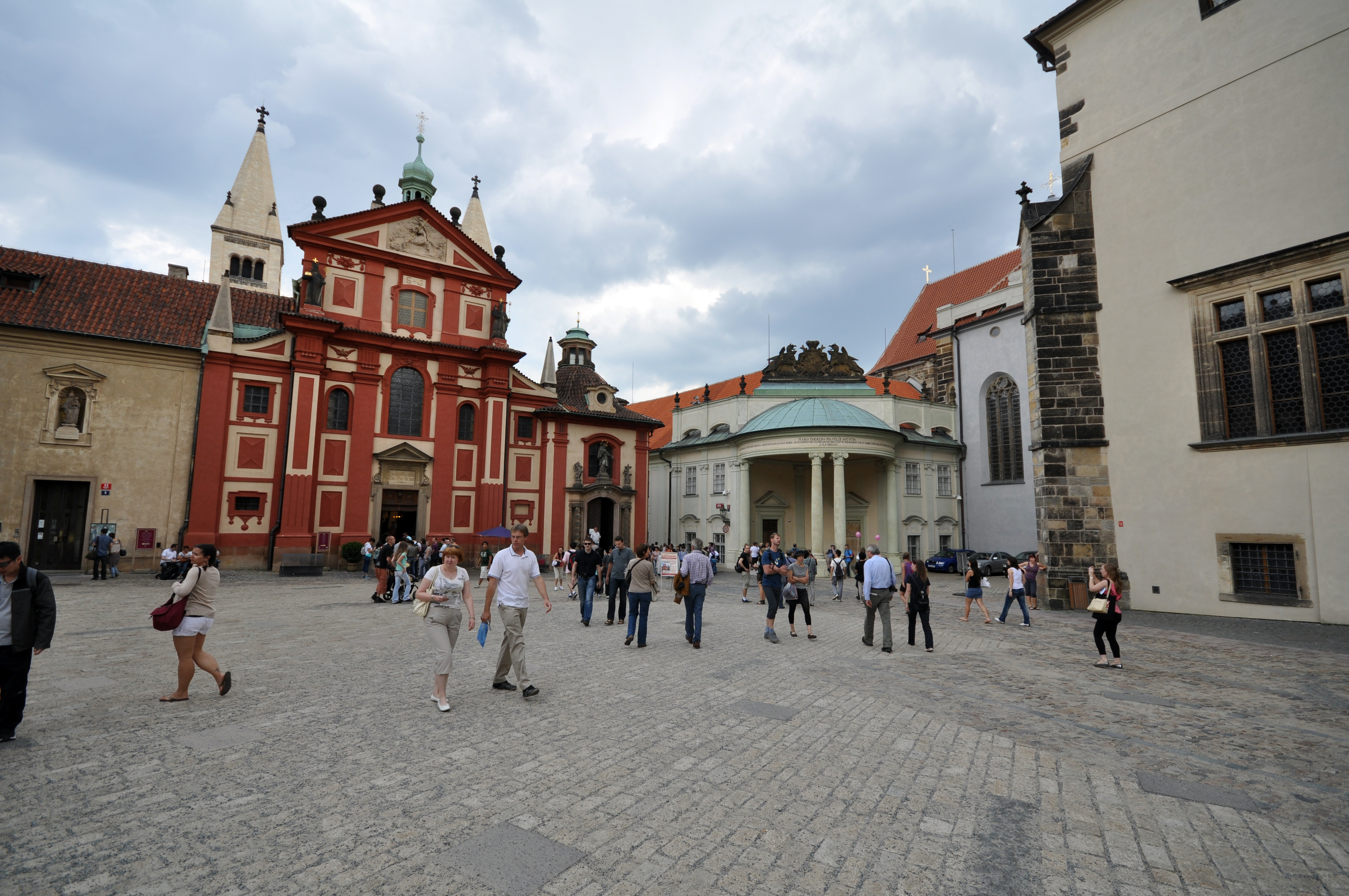
- The square in 2011

- Location within Czech Republic
- Coordinates: 50.0911°N 14.4018°E

St. George's Square (Czech: Náměstí U Svatého Jiří) is located at Prague Castle in Prague, Czech Republic.
