= Michael von Gmünd =

Michael Parler II, also known as Michael von Gmünd or Michael of Freiburg, born around 1350 in Freiburg im Breisgau and died in 1387-88 probably in Strasbourg, was a construction foreman of the Strasbourg Cathedral.

He belongs to the Parler family, a stonemason, construction foremen, and architect family. He probably is the son of Johann Parler the Elder, architect in Freiburg and Basel, from whom he inherited the mason's mark.

Between 1380 and 1385, Michael worked in Freiburg on the construction of the apse of the Freiburg Minster. He became foreman on the Strasbourg cathedral construction site in 1383: a Michel Parler, known as Michael von Gmünd, was recorded there as magister operis from 1383 to 1387. At that time, he devoted himself to restoration work after a fire in 1384.

He is the designer of the carpentry of the pipe organ's case and its lower part completed in 1385, and he probably worked on the facade of the cathedral, on the apostles' gallery, and on the elevation of the belfry: between 1383 and 1387/88 he would have filled the space between the two towers above the large rose window, profoundly modifying the appearance of the facade.
