= Holzhauer =

Holzhauer is a German-language surname, meaning "woodsman" or "lumberjack". Notable people with the surname include:

- Emil Holzhauer (1887–1986), German artist
- Fritz Holzhäuer (1902–1982), German general in the Wehrmacht during World War II
- James Holzhauer (born 1984), American game show contestant and professional sports gambler
