= Andreas Hofmann =

Andreas Hofmann may refer to:

- Andreas Joseph Hofmann (1752–1849), German philosopher and revolutionary
- Andreas Hofmann (footballer) (born 1986), footballer for Karlsruher SC
- Andreas Hofmann (javelin thrower) (born 1991), German javelin thrower
