= Richard Arnold (politician) =

German politician (born 1959)

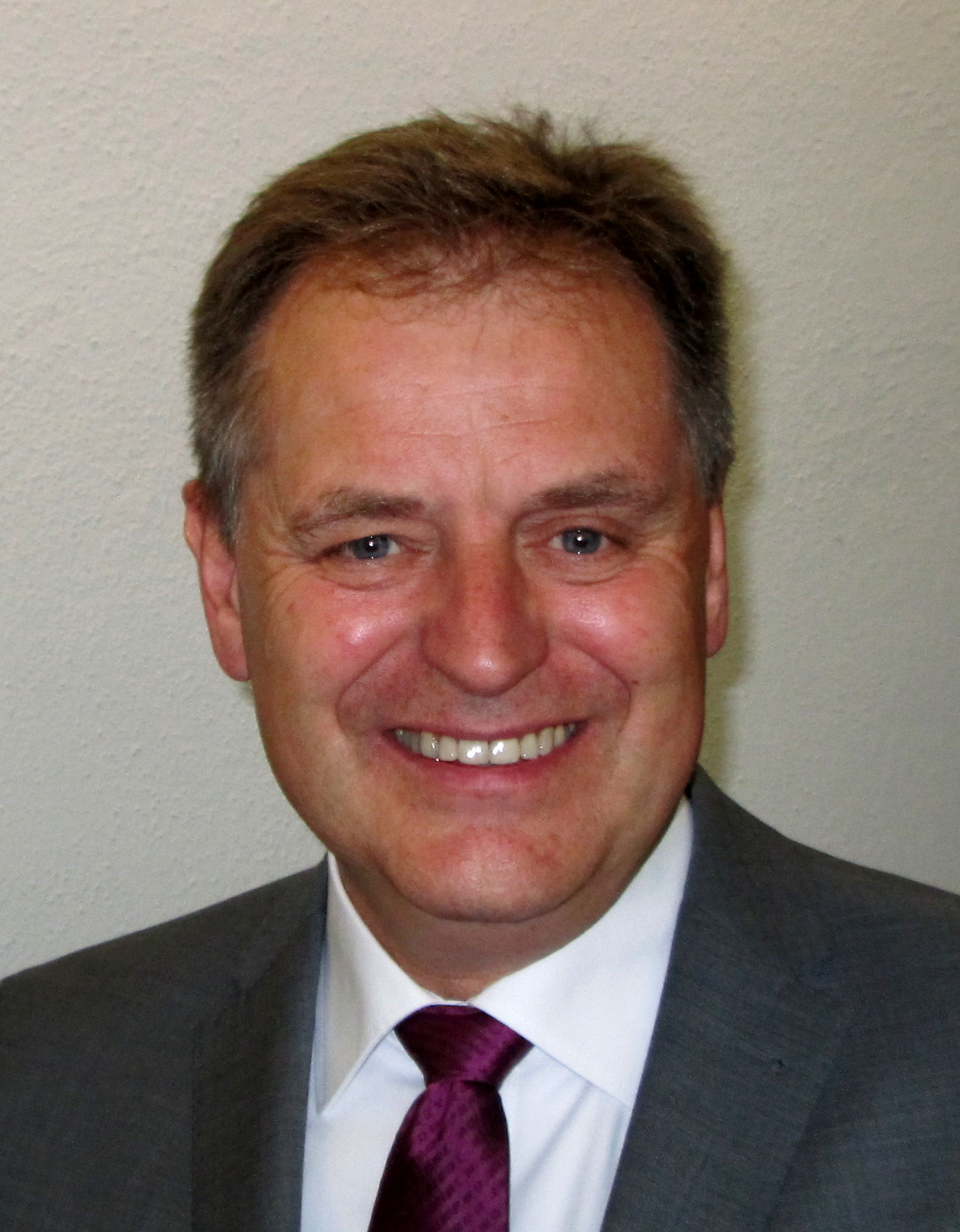

Lord Mayor of Schwäbisch Gmünd
- Incumbent
- Assumed office 30 July 2009
- Preceded by: Wolfgang Leidig

Head of the State Agency of Baden-Württemberg to the European Union
- In office 2000–2009

Personal details
- Born: 11 January 1959 (age 67)
- Party: Christian Democratic Union of Germany
- Spouse: Stephan Kirchenbauer
- Education: Scheffold Gymnasium
- Alma mater: Massachusetts Institute of Technology; College of Europe
- Occupation: politician

Richard Josef Arnold (born 11 January 1959) is a German politician. A member of the Christian Democratic Union of Germany, he has served as the Lord Mayor (Oberbürgermeister) of Schwäbisch Gmünd since 2009 and is the city's first openly gay mayor. As mayor, he has pushed for opening up the city to refugees. Previously, Arnold was the head of the State Agency of Baden-Württemberg to the European Union.

== Early life and education ==
Arnold was born on 11 January 1959 in Herdtlinsweiler, a suburb of Schwäbisch Gmünd in Weiler in den Bergen. He was the eldest of three children and the son of a farmer. After graduating from Scheffold Gymnasium in Schwäbisch Gmünd, he studied administrative sciences at the University of Konstanz and Goethe University Frankfurt until 1986. He was awarded a scholarship to study abroad at the Massachusetts Institute of Technology in Cambridge, Massachusetts, where he graduated in 1988. Arnold was awarded a postgraduate scholarship from the German Council of the European Movement to study abroad at the College of Europe in Bruges.

== Career ==
From 1988 to 1990 Arnold was a project manager at the Centre for European Policy Studies in Brussels, focusing on environmental and agricultural policies. In 1990 he served as the Deputy Head of the Ministry of Agriculture for the Federation for the Environment and Conservation in Stuttgart. He was later appointed as head of the Ministry of Food and Rural Areas in Baden-Württemberg, serving in this capacity until 1993. Later that year he served as the Deputy Head of the European Department in the State Ministry of Baden-Württemberg. From 1996 to 2000 he worked as the head of the Department of Inter-regional Cooperation. From 2000 to 2009 he was the Head of the State Agency of Baden-Württemberg to the European Union in Brussels. He was named as one of the ten most influential Germans living in Brussels by Manager Magazin.

In 2009 Arnold ran in the mayoral election in Schwäbisch Gmünd. He defeated the incumbent Social Democrat mayor, Wolfgang Leidig, in the first ballot on May 10, 2009 with 55.4% of the vote. Arnold took office as Lord Mayor on 30 July 2009. He is the first openly gay mayor in the predominantly Catholic city. As mayor, Arnold helped lead voluntary commitments to the city, including its 850th anniversary celebration in 2012. He was awarded the Mérite Européen Medal in 2012. In 2013 he became the first German mayor to receive the Mayor of the Month Award from the International City Mayors Foundation in London for his response to the refugee crisis in Europe. He helped organize the State Horticultural Show Schwäbisch Gmünd in 2014, recruiting 1,300 volunteers. He led urban redevelopment initiatives in Schwäbisch Gmünd, which lead to the city receiving the Otto Borst Prize for Urban Renewal in 2016.

In July 2013 Arnold partnered with Deutsche Bahn to recruit African refugees to work for the railway. The partnership caused controversy, and Deutsche Bahn later replaced the refugees with their own employees. Arnold continued his commitment to find work for refugees in Germany, employing 60 asylum seekers to help with the State Garden Show in 2014 and later with the Festival Europäische Kirchenmusik. Arnold called for political reform in the issue of accepting refugees into the country, and advocates for integrating refugees into city life.

In 2016 Arnold was considered as a possible candidate in the election for the Minister-President of Baden-Württemberg. He declined to run for the office of Minister-President, instead announcing he would seak re-election as Lord Mayor of Schwäbisch Gmünd in October of that year. He was reelected to the office on 7 May 2017 with 85 percent of the vote and a voter turnout of 36.05 percent.

In February 2020 Arnold was considered as a top candidate for the Christian Democratic Union in the mayor election for Stuttgart but ultimately decided to decline the party's offer. Upon announcing his intentions to keep his office as Lord Mayor, he received a standing ovation from the town's council.

In July 2020 Arnold met with Sir Stephen Houghton, a British government official and head of the Barnsley Metropolitan Borough Council, via video conferences to offer support and advice for handling the COVID-19 pandemic. On 21 July 2020 Arnold, along with Boris Palmer and Matthias Klopfer, wrote a letter to Baden-Württemberg Minister-President Winfried Kretschmann and Minister of the Interior Thomas Strobl about riots affecting their towns.

== Personal life ==
Arnold is openly gay. He was married to Stephan Kirchenbauer, an artist and personal secretary to Princess Diane, Duchess of Württemberg, until Kirchenbauer's death in 2012. He and Kirchenbauer lived in Arnold's parents' house in Herdtlinsweiler.

He is a practicing Christian and is fluent in German, French, English, Dutch, and Spanish.

Arnold is a founding member of the Herdtlinsweiler Village Development Association and a member of the Board of Trustees of the Academy for Spoken Word in Stuttgart. A tenor, he sings in a church choir and served as Chairman of the City Association for Music and Singing in Schwäbisch Gmünd.
