= St. John's Catholic Church (Schwäbisch Gmünd) =

Catholic church in Schwäbisch Gmünd, Germany

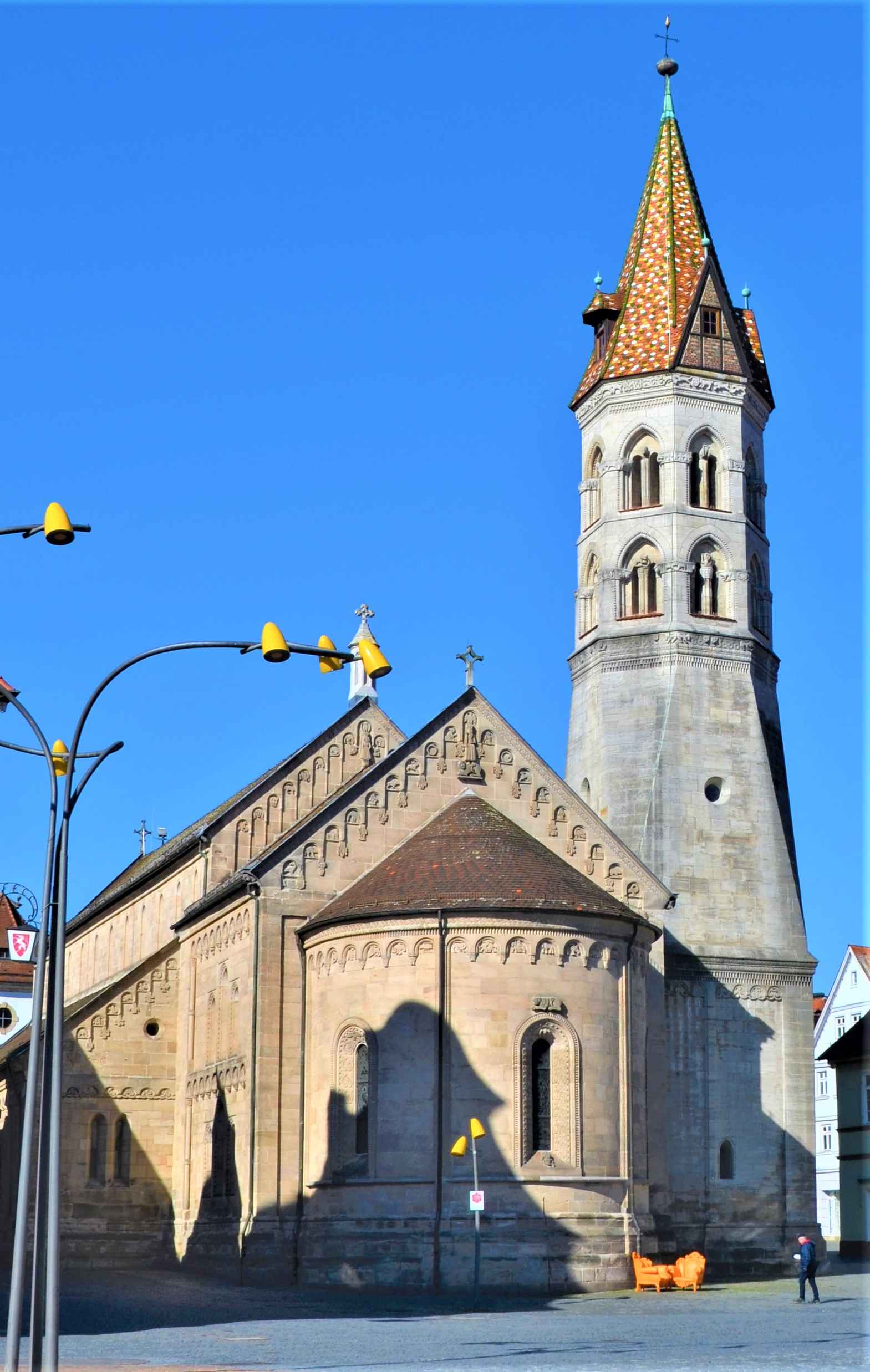
St. John's Church in 2020

St. John the Baptist of the Catholic Parish Church of the Holy Cross Minster (German: Johanniskirche) is a Catholic church in Schwäbisch Gmünd, Germany. It is part of the parish of the Holy Cross Minster.

== History ==
According to legend, the church was built on the location where Agnes of Hohenstaufen's wedding ring was discovered after she lost it while out on a hunt.

A cannonball fired during the Thirty Years' War (1618–1648) remains visibly lodged in the apse of the church.
