= Rokokoschlösschen (Schwäbisch Gmünd) =

Palace in Schwäbisch Gmünd

- Stahlschem Schlösschen
- Rokokoschlösschen in 2014
- Location: Am Stadtgarten 4, 73525; Schwäbisch Gmünd, Germany

History
- Built: 1780

Site notes
- Architect: Baroque

The Rokokoschlösschen, also known as the Stahlschem Schlösschen, is a Baroque palace in Schwäbisch Gmünd, Germany.

== History ==
Georg Franz Stahl, mayor of Schwäbisch Gmünd, had a town garden established in 1779. The following year, he had a "pleasure palace" built for his wife, Veronika.

The palace now operates as a wedding venue.
