= Walter Giers =

- Born: May 10, 1937; Mannweiler, Nazi Germany
- Died: April 3, 2016 (aged 78); Schwäbisch Gmünd, Germany
- Known for: Electronic art

Walter Adolf Giers (May 10, 1937 in Mannweiler, Germany - April 3, 2016 in Schwäbisch Gmünd, Germany) was a German light, sound and media artist and a pioneer of electronic art.

== Life ==
Walter Giers lived in Schwäbisch Gmünd since 1960. After school and an apprenticeship in steel engraving, he originally started as jazz musician in 1955. From 1959 to 1963, he studied at the Higher Professional and Technical School for Precious Metals in Schwäbisch Gmünd, and graduated in Industrial Design as Diplom Designer.

In 1963, he established his own business in Industrial Design "Form and Function" in Schwäbisch Gmünd. In 1992-93, he had a lectureship at the Academy for Design in Karlsruhe and was an associated artist at the Zentrum für Kunst- und Medientechnologie (Center for Art and Media), in Karlsruhe. In 1968, he began with the production of artwork on the basis of electronic circuits. From 1985 and onwards, he had also been developing lighting concepts for various municipalities, since 1990 in partnership with the designer Berthold Beuthe (*1962 in Backnang).

Walter Giers also worked together with Kurt Weidemann, professor of communication, the jazz musician Wolfgang Dauner and the soundtrack composer Mick Baumeister. In 2003, Walter Giers was rewarded with the Maria-Ensle-Price from the Art Foundation Baden-Württemberg and in 2007, he was honored with the Order of Merit of the Federal Republic of Germany. In 2011, he received the Cultural Award Baden-Württemberg from the Volksbanken Raiffeisenbanken and the Baden-Württemberg Foundation.

== Work ==
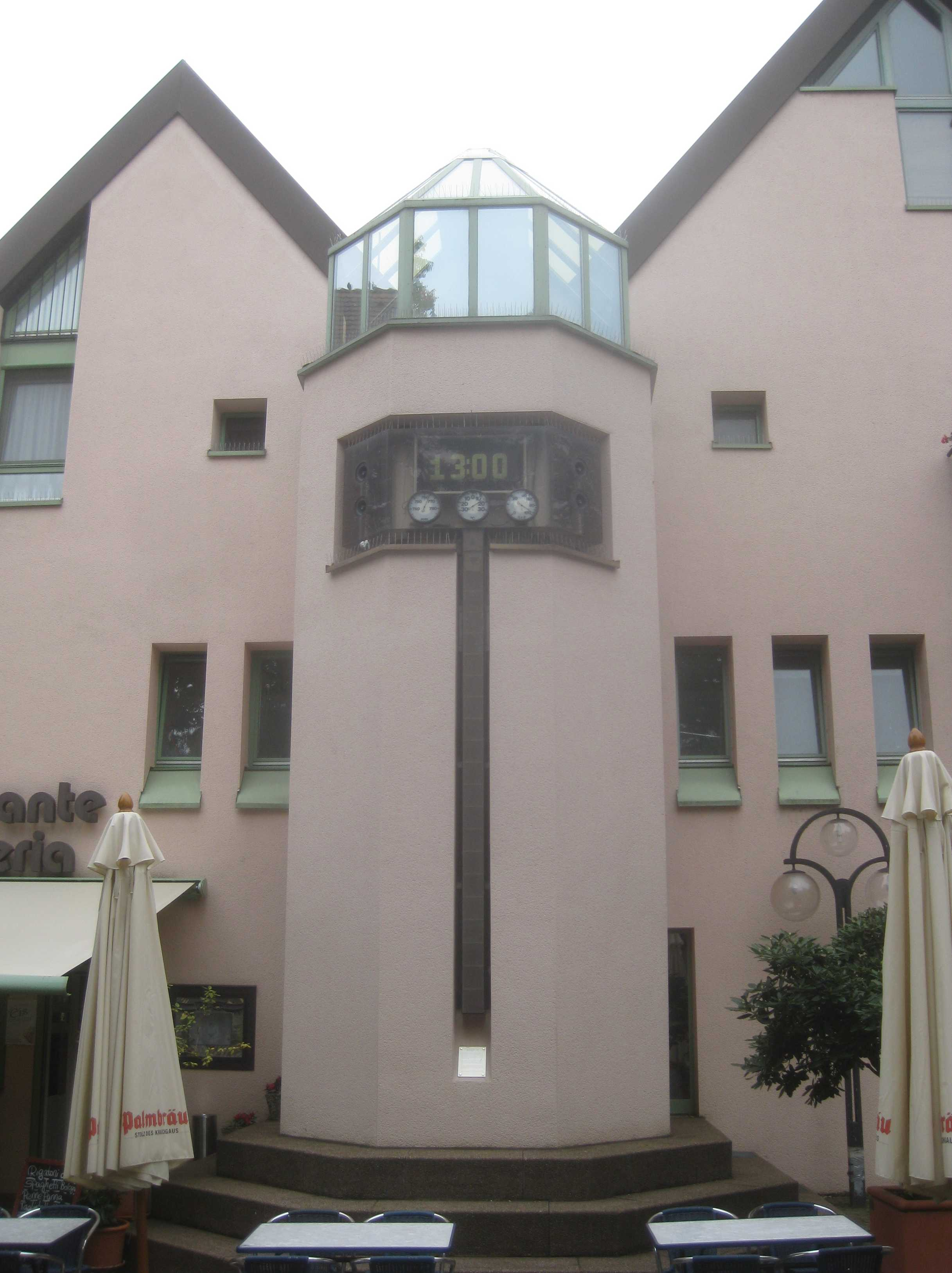
Güglinger Uhr Güglinger Uhr by Walter Giers, electronic clock with optical and acoustical effects, 1982/1983, Güglingen.

Walter Giers mostly worked in the field of kinetic, light and sound art. New about his artworks was his innovative idea to integrate electric circuits into art objects, which, apart from the functionality to create sounds and light, also proved to be exquisite design elements. In 1968, he developed his first interactive object, the radio sculpture "Mr. Brabbel". On this object the contemplator could manipulate and influence the object itself by provoking sounds and light effects, what turned out to be the future basic principle for many of his later works.

Furthermore, Giers used other media like laser, video and holography. He also made use of his art to point out various subjects of discussion; such as the environment (wale hunting), conflicts with media (indiscretion in journalism), psychical anomalies (insanity) or the use and abuse of religion. He mostly worked with ambiguities and concealed these problems behind visual attractive façades of acrylic glass, behind which electronic bulbs, neon tubes, lamps, wires, electronic chips, transistors, capacitors and transformers were installed and speakers had been integrated.

But there are also a number of works that are without any deeper meaning or substance, especially those playing with light and sound or varying luminous sources and colours, sometimes accompanied with different tunes and melodies.

== Exhibitions and collections ==
Giers’ work can be found at a number of museums and collections. For example, in the ‘Städtische Museum Gelsenkirchen’, ‘Center for Art and Media Karlsruhe' (ZKM)‚ 'Städtische Galerie Karlsruhe', 'Museum im Prediger' in Schwäbisch Gmünd, 'Museum für Neue Kunst' in Freiburg, Ministry for Science, Research and Art of Baden-Württemberg in Stuttgart, Museum Ritter in Waldenbuch, The Conrad Electronics Collection in Hirschau, the collection of Allianz Insurance, the collection of Daimler in Stuttgart and ‘The Marx Collection’ in Berlin. His work was already shown in more than 60 singular and group exhibitions as well as multiple installations, joint activities and conceptions.

On the occasion of his year of death in 2016, the Gmünder Society of Art has presented an exhibition headed "Concept.Coincidence" with numerous art works of Walter Giers.

Since 2020 the archive of Walter Giers is at ZKM | Center for Art and Media Karlsruhe.

== Literature ==
- W. Giers, Electronic Art, Berlin 1987, ISBN 3-433-02258-5
- L. Hünnekens in: Moving Image – Electronic Art, München / Stuttgart 1992, p. 44
- IDEA Guide international des arts electroniques, Paris 1992, p. 264
- F. Rötzer in: Kunstforum international Nr. 122, 1993, p. 334
- H. Klotz, Eine neue Hochschule für neue Künste, Stuttgart 1995, p. 65, ISBN 3-89322-737-7
- Musik und Licht. Wolfgang Dauner, Randi Bubat, Walter Giers, Ostfildern-Ruit 1996, ISBN 3-89322-320-7
- H. Klotz (pub.), Kunst der Gegenwart, München / New York 1997, pp. 104, 294, ISBN 3-7913-1835-7
- A. Hünnekens, Der bewegte Betrachter, Theorien der interaktiven Medienkunst, Cologne 1997, p. 97, ISBN 3-87909-514-0
- Kinetische Kunst, Die Sammlung des Städtischen Museums Gelsenkirchen, Heidelberg 1998, p. 136, ISBN 3-89466-218-2
- Allgemeines Künstlerlexikon (AKL), Band 53, Berlin / New York 2007
- R. B. Heer, Elektronische Kunst = Konkrete Kunst? in: dot20, Computer Art Faszination, Frankfurt/Main 2009, p. 26
