= Robert von Ostertag =

German veterinarian

Robert von Ostertag 1922

Robert von Ostertag (March 24, 1864 – October 7, 1940) was a German veterinarian who was a native of Schwäbisch Gmünd.

He studied medicine in Berlin and veterinary medicine in Stuttgart, afterwards becoming a professor of hygiene at Tierärztliche Hochschule Stuttgart (1891–1892) and at the College of Veterinary Medicine in Berlin (1892–1907). In 1907 he became head of the veterinary department in the Reich Health Office in Berlin. In 1910 he traveled to German Southwest Africa in order to study diseases of sheep, and in 1913 he investigated rinderpest in German East Africa. In 1920 he became head of veterinary services in Germany.

In the 1890s, Ostertag started a rigorous program of meat inspection in Berlin, and he was referred to as the "Father of Veterinary Meat Inspection" in Germany. Ostertag's meat inspection act of 1900 greatly reduced incidences of bovine tuberculosis in human beings.

He was the author of numerous publications in veterinary science, and is remembered for his influential Lehrbuch für Fleischbeschauer ("Handbook of Meat Inspection"), a book that was later translated into English.

His name is lent to Ostertagia, a genus of attenuated nematodes of the family Trichostrongylidae. These organisms are found in cysts on the wall of the abomasum of cattle and other ruminants. The disease associated with the organism is called "ostertagiosis".
