= Konrad Elser =

German pianist

Konrad Elser is a German pianist, born in Schwäbisch Gmünd.

Elser won the 1985 Epinal Competition, and was awarded the 1982 Concours de Geneve's 3rd prize and the 1987 Concorso Busoni's 5th prize. He has performed internationally as a soloist and a chamber musician.

He is a professor at the Musikhochschule Lübeck, where he has taught since 1992.
