= Pädagogische Hochschule Schwäbisch Gmünd =

University of Education Schwäbisch Gmünd
- Pädagogische Hochschule Schwäbisch Gmünd
- Other names: PH Gmünd, University of Education Schwäbisch Gmünd, PH Schwäbisch Gmünd
- Former name: Pädagogisches Institut Schwäbisch Gmünd
- Type: public research university
- Established: 1825
- Parent institution: Pädagogische Hochschulen Baden-Württemberg
- Budget: 13,370,000 € (2016)
- Rector: Kim-Patrick Sabla-Dimitrov
- Academic staff: 179
- Administrative staff: 100
- Students: ▲2,800
- Undergraduates: ▲1,857 (2016)
- Postgraduates: ▲392 (2016)
- Location: Pädagogische Hochschule Schwäbisch Gmünd / University of Education Schwäbisch Gmünd - Oberbettringer Straße 200, Schwäbisch Gmünd, Baden-Württemberg, 73525, Germany; 48.7915°N 9.8296°E
- Campus: Urban
- Language: German, English
- Website: www.ph-gmuend.de

Pädagogische Hochschule Schwäbisch Gmünd (also known as PH Schwäbisch Gmünd, PHSG or University of Education Schwäbisch Gmünd) is a public research university located in Schwäbisch Gmünd, Baden-Württemberg, Germany. Founded in 1825 as Pädagogisches Institut Schwäbisch Gmünd, it was transformed into a university in 1962 and now is a part of the Pädagogische Hochschulsystem Baden-Württemberg. It is one out of six such universities in the state of Baden-Württemberg (the other five being PH Karlsruhe, PH Ludwigsburg, PH Freiburg, PH Weingarten and PH Heidelberg).

The university consists of two faculties and offers nine bachelor degree programmes as well as 11 master degree programmes. PH Schwäbisch Gmünd comprises two major campuses; one in Oberbettringen (main campus and administration) and one in downtown Schwäbisch Gmünd (campus for music students). The language of instruction is usually German, but there are also courses held in English and other modern foreign languages.

PH Schwäbisch Gmünd holds several awards including the Helmuth-Lang-Price as well as the Irma-Schmücker-Price. The PH Schwäbisch Gmünd is also ranked as one of the top universities of Baden-Württemberg.

== History ==
PH Schwäbisch Gmünd has a nearly 200 year long tradition. It was originally founded as a seminar in 1825 at the old campus in downtown Schwäbisch Gmünd. After several reforms, the Seminar transformed into a scientific university with the right to promotion and habilitation. The newly founded Pädagogische Hochschule moved to the Campus Hardt at the edge of Schwäbisch Gmünd.

=== Timeline ===
- 1825: opening as a catholic seminar in the old "Franziskaner Mannskloster" in Schwäbisch Gmünd to educate teachers
- 1837: revolt in the "Gmünder Seminar"
- 1839: 74 seminarists are enlisted in the seminar
- 1849: newly religious impacts of the "Tübinger Schule" influence the seminar
- 1860: opening of a private, catholic teacher seminar
- 1866–1899: education of teachers takes three years + internship at scholar institutions
- 1874: blackboards are introduced
- 1905: move to a seminar building at Lessingstraße in Schwäbisch Gmünd
- 1934: closing of the seminar by the Nazi Regime
- 1937: closing of the teacher's seminar
- 1946: re-opening of the teacher's seminar after World War II ends
- 1947: teacher's seminar renames itself to Pädagogisches Institut (Educational Institute)
- 1962: Pädagogisches Institut transforms into a Pädagogische Hochschule (Educational University School) with 440 students
- 1965: extension of the studies to six semesters
- 1971: educational universities in Baden-Württemberg get the status of scientific research universities
- 1972: moving to the new campus at Schwäbisch Gmünd - Hardt
- 1975: 1,700 students enrolled at the PH Schwäbisch Gmünd
- 1975: extension of the degrees to not only teaching specific ones
- 1984: first international university partnership with the University of Central England in Birmingham
- 1985: co-operation agreement with Universität Tübingen for promotion
- 1987: educational universities in Baden-Württemberg get the unshared and sole right to promotion from the state legislature
- 1988: new bachelor degrees: media education and transport education
- 2002: first habitation at the PH Schwäbisch Gmünd
- 2004: over 2,000 students are enrolled in a bachelor or master degree at PH Schwäbisch Gmünd
- 2005: a new law permits the PH Schwäbisch Gmünd more autonomy and gives it the official state of a University according to German law

== Campuses ==
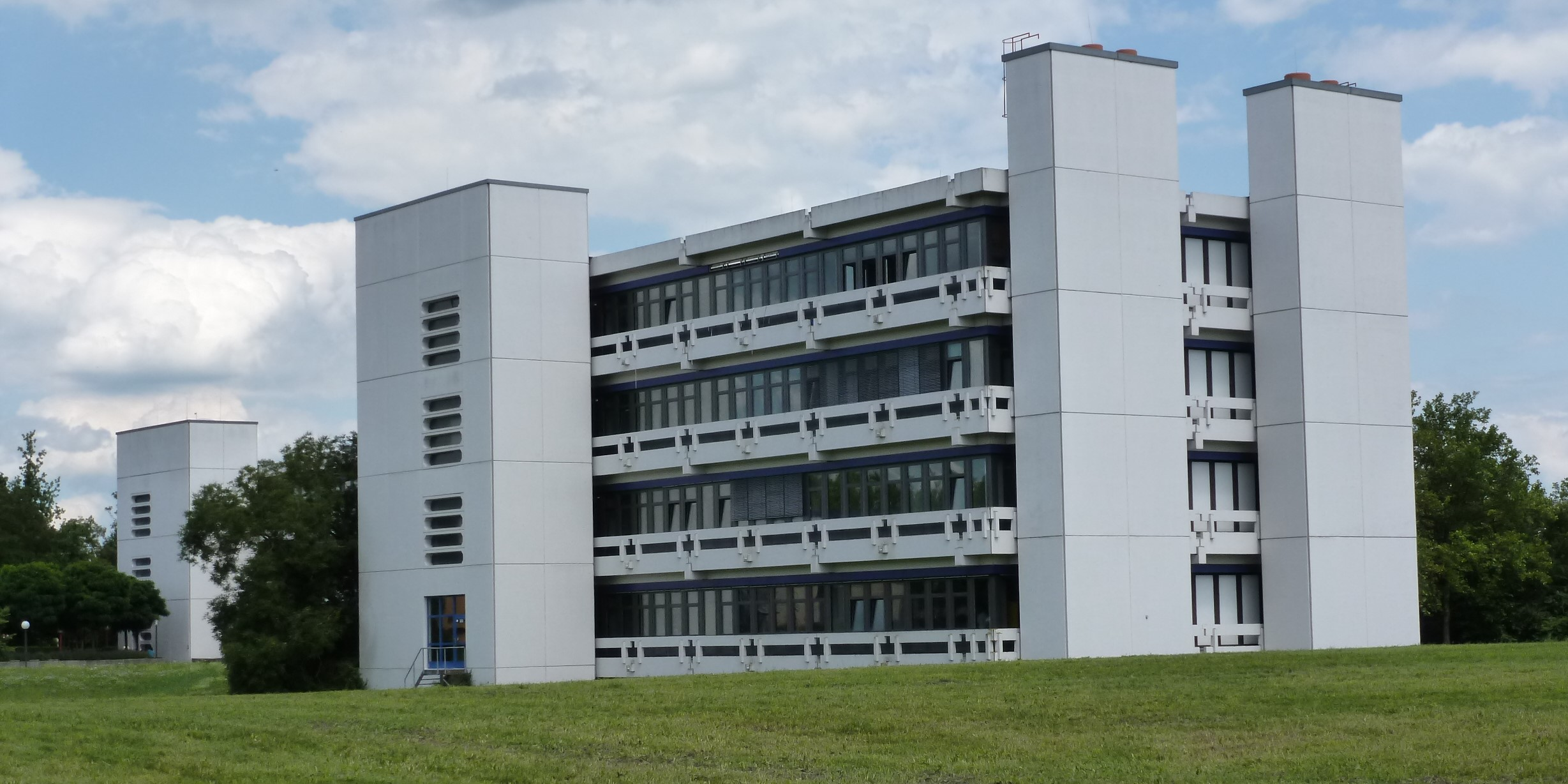
The main institutional and administrative building of the university

The PH Schwäbisch Gmünd has two campuses. The main campus is Campus Hardt, featuring the administration of the university and most of the lecturing halls and institutional buildings. It is situated in the neighborhood of Oberbettringer near downtown Schwäbisch Gmünd. The secondary campus is situated directly in downtown Schwäbisch Gmünd and only houses some music students. The whole area of the two campuses combined is about 110,000 square meter.

=== Campus Institutions ===
The Campus also houses an Institute for further education and teaching methods, a diagnostically center, a center for practical scientific research, a center for quality management and monitoring in youth- and child services as well as a so called "Bilderbuchwerkstatt BUFO".

The center for knowledge transfer of the PH Schwäbisch Gmünd was founded in 2012. Its purpose is to boost lifelong learning through scientific education and further education between research and practical application.

As of 2013, the Center for Competence in Health Promotion of the PH Schwäbisch Gmünd dedicates itself to interdisciplinary health promotion. The Center for Media Education researches educational concepts to boost the support of media education processes in and outside of educational institutions.

=== Leisure offerings ===
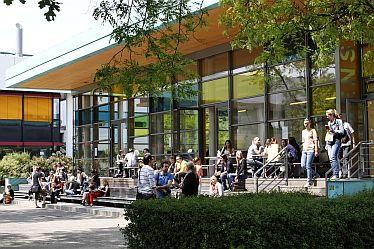
cafeteria of the PH Schwäbisch Gmünd

The campus offers a variety of leisure offerings for students and staff of the university. On the main campus, a cafeteria/canteen provides food supply for staff and students. In the institutional building, there are several sitting areas, a student café called Matrikü(h)l which is operated by older students. The institutional building is also home to the AStA, the student committee of the PH Schwäbisch Gmünd, which helps students with general questions and organizes events.

== Relevant numbers ==
=== Finances ===
PH Schwäbisch Gmünd is financed by several grants and state contributions. The total number of granted financial support was 14.373.599€ in 2016. This number is divided into state funding (10.472.600€ in 2016), third party income (1.208.494€ in 2016), special programmes (2.497.105€ in 2016) and other income.

=== Student statistics ===
PH Schwäbisch Gmünd had a total of 2.843 students in the winter semester 2016/17, of which about 2.192 were women and only 651 men. 1.857 of the total students studied teaching and were trained in teaching, while 652 students studied the non-teaching bachelor programmes. 237 master students were enrolled at the PH Schwäbisch Gmünd in 2016. In total, 2 women and 3 men promoted in 2015, while 48 promotion attempts where still ongoing in 2015.

=== Staff statistics ===
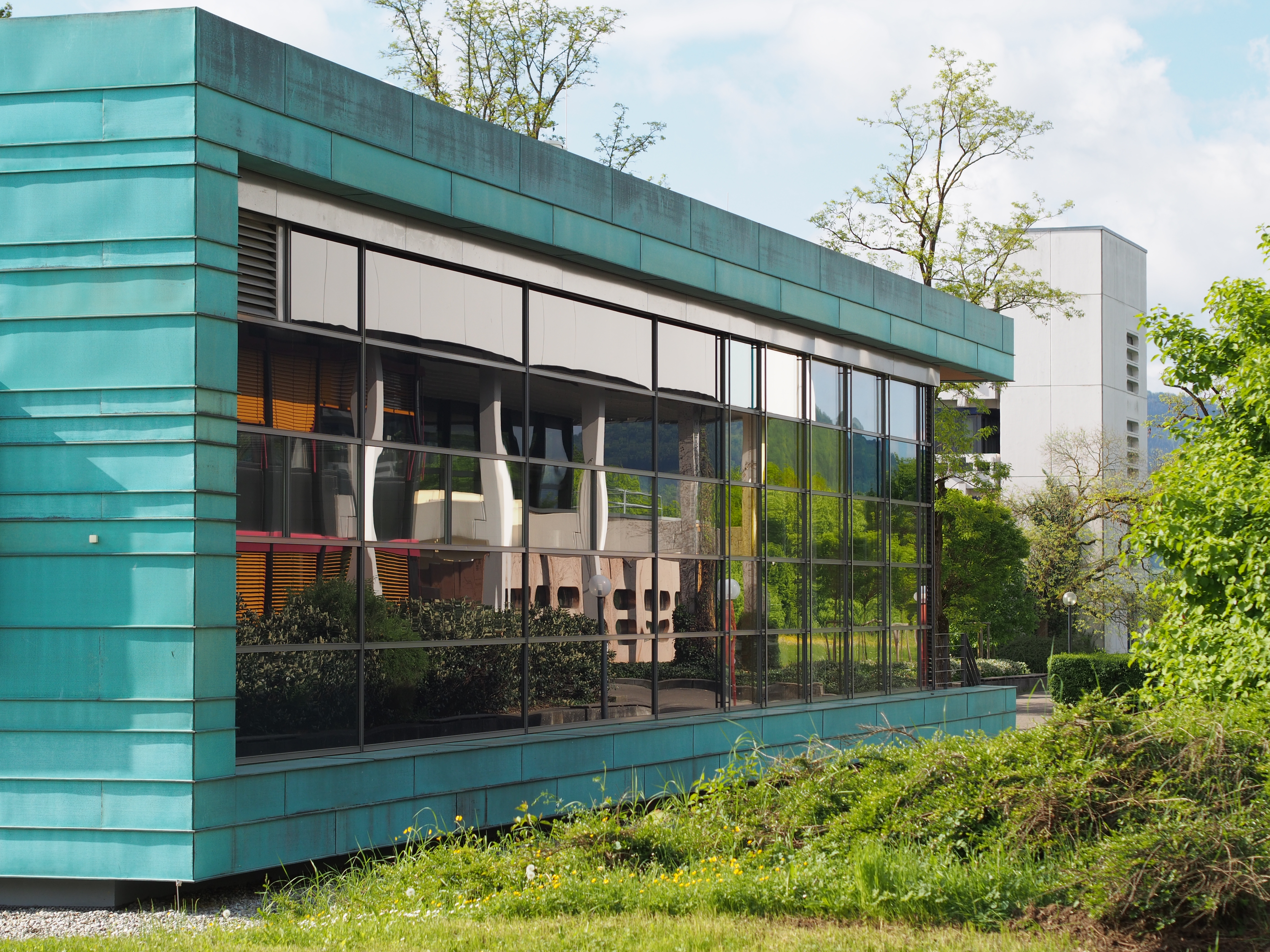
Buildings on the main campus

In total, 273 people worked at the Pädagogische Hochschule Schwäbisch Gmünd in 2017. The academic staff made out 180 of these 273 people. 50 of them being active lecturing professors, 110 being active in research and scientific employment and 20 being employed by third party employers.

== Faculties ==
Since the PH Schwäbisch Gmünd was founded purposely to train future teachers, there are only two faculties at the Pädagogische Hochschule Schwäbisch Gmünd.

- Faculty I: Institutions of teaching and education, workforce and technology, educational sciences, human sciences, care sciences as well as theology and religious education
- Faculty II: Institutions for languages and literature, arts, society studies, mathematics and information technologies, natural sciences as well as the institutions for childhood, youth and family

== Courses ==
PH Schwäbisch Gmünd offers a variety of Bachelor and Master programmes for its students. Since the purpose of a university of education in Germany is to train future teachers, some of those bachelor degrees are unique to the universities of education and can only be acquired at one of the six universities of education in Baden-Württemberg.

=== Bachelor ===
- Lehramt Grundschule (elementary school teaching)
- Lehramt Sekundarstufe I (middle- and secondary school teaching)
- Lehramt an beruflichen Schulen (professional school teaching)
- Kindheitspädagogik (childhood pedagogy)
- Gesundheitsförderung (health promotion)
- Ingenieurspädagogik (engineering pedagogy)
- Pflegewissenschaft (care sciences)
- Integrative Lerntherapie ZWPH (integrative learning therapy)
- Betriebliche Bildung ZWPH (business education)

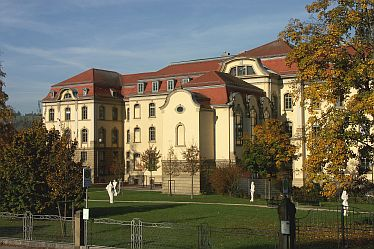
Old campus in downtown Schwäbisch Gmünd

=== Master ===
- Lehramt Grundschule (elementary school teaching)
- Lehramt Sekundarstufe I (middle- and secondary school teaching)
- Bildungswissenschaften (education sciences)
- Interkulturalität und Integration (interculturality and integration)
- Gesundheitsförderung und Prävention (health promotion and prevention)
- Kindheits- und Sozialpädagogik (childhood and social pedagogy)
- Ingenieurspädagogik (engineering pedagogy)
- Germanistik und Interkulturalität / Multilingualität (Germanistik and interculturality / multilinguality)
- Pflegepädagogik (care pedagogy)
- Integrative Lerntherapie (integrative learning therapy)
- Personalentwicklung und Bildungsmanagement (personnel development and education management)

=== Additional courses ===
- Erweiterungs- und Ergänzungsstudiengänge – Beratung und Medienpädagogik (expansional and additional courses – consultation and media pedagogy)
- Promotion
- Habilitation

== Notable people ==
=== Rectors ===
- Adalbert Neuburger (1962–1965)
- Hans Dreger (1965–1968)
- Johannes Riede (1968–1974)
- Karl Setzen (1974–1976)
- Josef Lauter (1976–1978)
- Reinhard Kuhnert (1978–1990)
- Albert Heller (1990–1994)
- Karl Setzen (1994–1998)
- Manfred Wespel (1998–2002)
- Hans-Jürgen Albers (2002–2010)
- Astrid Beckmann (2010–2018)
- Claudia Vorst (2018 – 2024)
- Kim-Patrick Sabla-Dimitrov (since 2024)

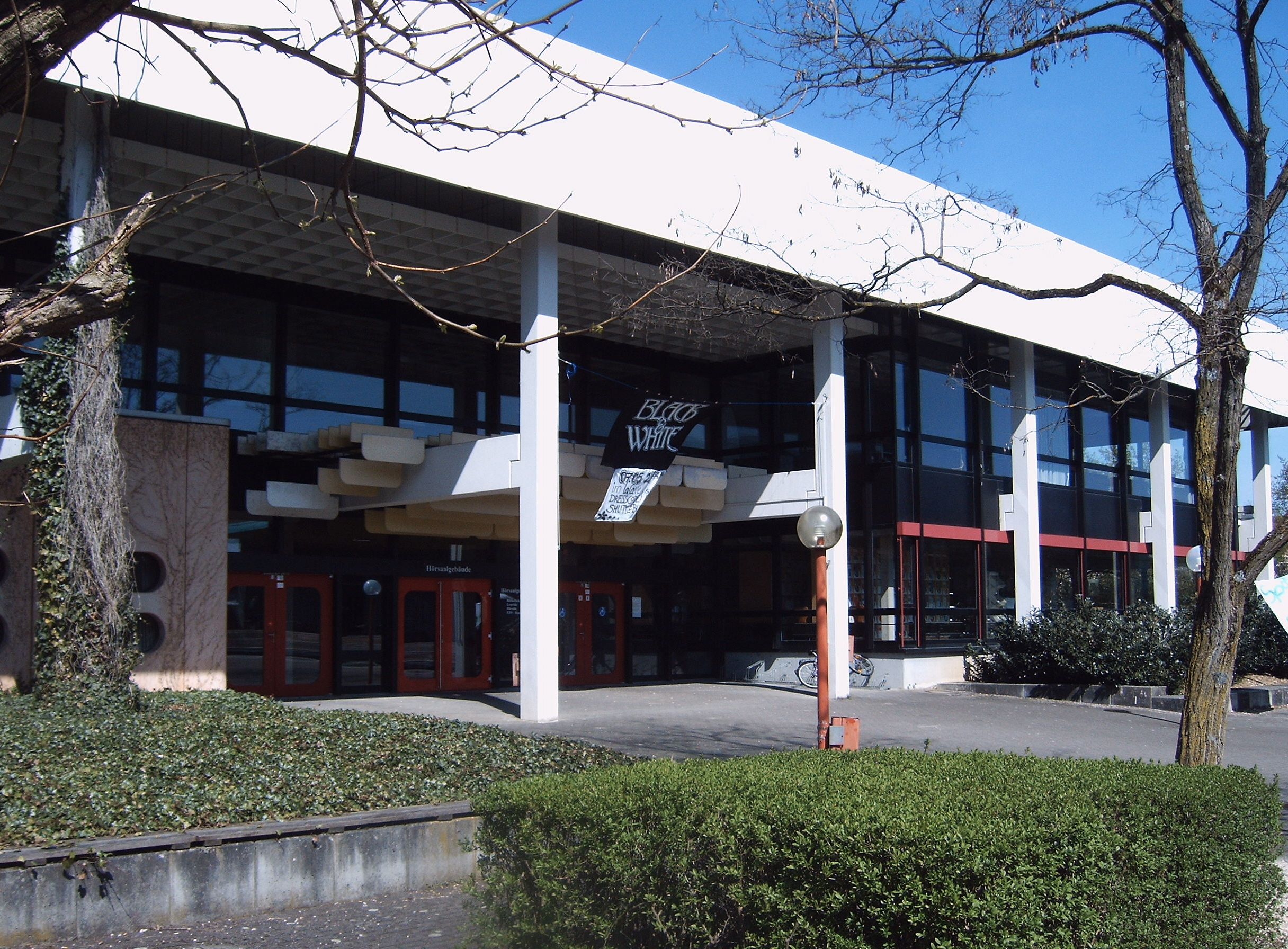
Entrance to lecture hall building containing HS1, the largest lecture hall of the university

=== Academic staff ===
- Günter Altner (1936–2011), biology
- Hubert Beck (1935–2011), music
- Stephan Beck (* 1974), music
- Andreas Benk (* 1957), theology
- Albert Deibele (1889–1972), geography
- Roger Erb (* 1961), physics
- Tim Engartner (* 1976), social studies
- Martin Fix (* 1961), pedagogy
- Erich Ganzenmüller (1914–1983), music
- Axel Horn (* 1954), pedagogy and physical sciences
- Jürgen Hunkemöller (* 1939), music
- Stefan Immerfall (* 1958), sociology
- Bernhard Kaißer (1834–1918), grammar, literature and history at Lehrerseminar
- Notburga Karl (* 1973), arts
- Lutz Kasper (* 1964), physics
- Adolf Kern (1906–1976), musical training und didactics
- Hermann Kissling (1925–2018), arts
- German Josef Krieglsteiner (1937–2001), biology
- Alke Martens (* 1970), information technologies
- Wolf Mayer (* 1956), music
- Hilary Mooney (* 1962), theology
- Willy Potthoff (1925–2006), pedagogy
- Hein Retter (* 1937), pedagogy
- Thomas Retzmann (* 1963), economic pedagogy
- Rudolf Sauter (1925–2013), pedagogy
- Fridolin Schneider (1855–1922), mathematics
- Helmar Schöne (* 1966), politics
- Michael Tilly (* 1963), theology
- Franz Trautmann (* 1939), theology
- Franz Josef Wetz (* 1958), philosophy

=== Students ===
- Peter Spranger (1926–2013), historian
- Rudolf W. Keck (* 1935), professor
- Karl Hahn (* 1937), politics
- Gudrun Ensslin (1940–1977), founder of RAF Red Army Faction
- Werner H. A. Debler (1940–2014), pedagogy
- Wolfgang Staiger (* 1947), politics
- Wilfried Schlagenhauf (* 1952), professor at PH Freiburg
- Werner Knapp (* 1953), rector at PH Weingarten
- Mick Baumeister (* 1958), Jazz pianist
- Carsten Quesel (* 1961), sociology
- Thomas H. Häcker (* 1962), professor
- Steffen Osvath (* 1978), photography artist
