= Hermann Weller =

German poet (1878-1956)

Hermann Weller (4 February 1878 - 9 December 1956) was a German Indiologist and Neo-Latin poet born in Schwäbisch Gmünd, died in Tübingen. He is considered the Horace of the twentieth century.

== Early life ==
Weller's father was a businessman concerned with industrial products and a commercial traveller, and his mother was a baker's daughter from Gmünd. His parents died by 1890, so the 12-year-old was an orphan along with his eight siblings but his parents’ maid took care of the upbringing of the nine children.

== Education ==
Hermann Weller transferred from the Real Lyceum in Gmünd to the "Latin School" in Bad Mergentheim. In 1897, he passed the school leaving examination. Weller then studied law in Berlin and Tübingen, and then Classical Languages. In 1901 he received his doctorate in Latin and Sanskrit. In subsequent years, he completed his state examination in Latin, Greek, French and Hebrew. He also distinguished himself by a sound knowledge of English, Italian, Indian and Persian.

== Working life ==
After his studies in Tübingen, the classical philologist taught as a school teacher in the Ellwangen Gymnasium between 1913 and 1931. He also held a position at the Ehingen Gymnasium. In 1930 he qualified as a university teacher in Tübingen.

Weller was already so famous by 1931 that in that year the Ellwangen town council decided to name a street after him.

== The "Y Elegy" ==
Weller wrote the elegy in neo-Latin Y Elegy, which describes how in a poet's dream the letters of the alphabet from a volume of Horace's poetry become alive, and how A calls in a demagogic speech for the extermination of the foreign letter Y. Y escapes and tries through words (myths, mysticism, rhythm, and physics) to prove its right to exist, but the other letters do not allow themselves to be convinced, and are in the process of excluding Y. The poet asks for release and awakes from this nightmare.

Weller, a private senior lecturer, at Tübingen University, submitted the Y Elegy at the end of 1937, to the Certamen Hoeufftianum, a competition of neo-Latin poetry of the Royal Dutch Academy of Wetenschappen (KNAW) held annually in Amsterdam, which he won thirteen times in the course of his life. In 1938 Weller was awarded the Gold Medal for this text. The fact that Weller could be promoted to the position of Special Professor in the same year (despite certain doubts on account of his Catholicism) shows that knowledge of Latin among Nazi officials was not wide.

The Latin scholar, Uwe Dubielzig, recognised in 2001 that the text was a playfully disguised accusation against the ever more apparent anti-Semitism of the Nazis, the effects of which Weller could observe in his immediate surroundings of Tübingen University. Additionally, if the text cannot be read as a document of anti-fascist resistance, it is still a spirited but camouflaged document opposing the Nazi racist politics, the full brutality of which, before the pogrom of the so-called Reichskristallnacht, Weller would have underestimated, (as did Charlie Chaplin even in 1940 in his film The Great Dictator). In that sense the Y Elegy can be assessed as a remarkable testimony for 'internal emigration'.

== Additional sources ==
- lat. Text von Y im Rahmen der Carmina
- Uwe Dubielzig Die neue Königin der Elegien Hermann Wellers Gedicht ’Y’
