= Samuele Di Benedetto =

German footballer

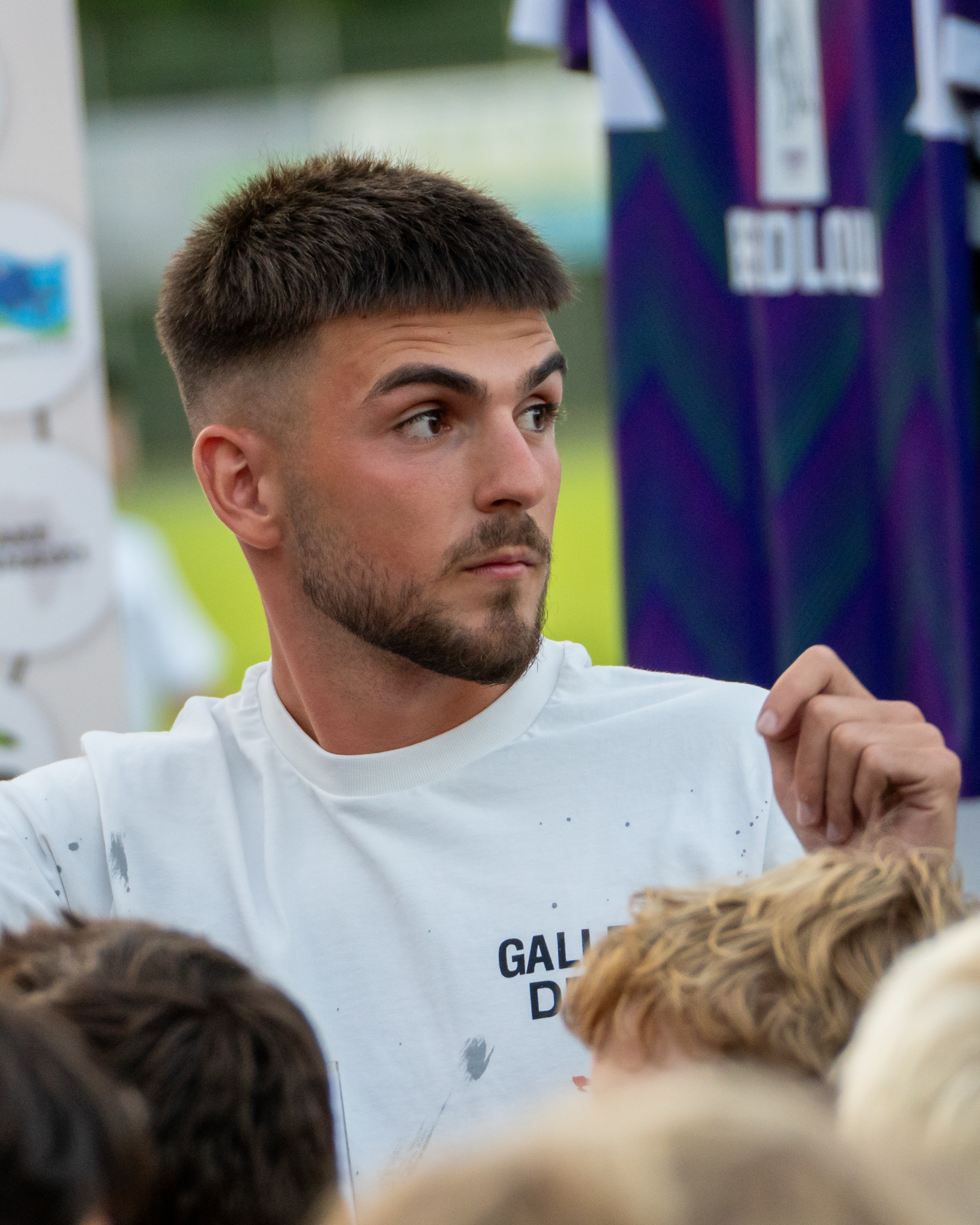

Personal information
- Date of birth: 16 July 2005 (age 21)
- Place of birth: Schwäbisch Gmünd, Germany
- Height: 1.75 m (5 ft 9 in)
- Position: Defensive midfielder

Team information
- Current team: Eintracht Braunschweig
- Number: 10

Youth career
- 2011–2012: TV Lindach
- 2012–2016: 1. FC Normannia Gmünd
- 2016–2019: 1. FC Heidenheim
- 2019–2023: VfB Stuttgart

Senior career*
Years	Team	Apps	(Gls)
2023–2026	VfB Stuttgart II	82	(2)
2023–2024	VfB Stuttgart	1	(0)
2026–	Eintracht Braunschweig	0	(0)

International career
2021–2022	Germany U17	13	(0)
2022–2023	Germany U18	5	(0)
2023	Germany U19	5	(0)
- * Club domestic league appearances and goals as of 30 May 2026

Samuele Di Benedetto (born 16 July 2005) is a German professional footballer who plays as a defensive midfielder for 2. Bundesliga club Eintracht Braunschweig.

== Club career ==
Di Benedetto is a youth product of TV Lindach, 1. FC Normannia Gmünd and 1. FC Heidenheim, before finishing his development with VfB Stuttgart. On 30 June 2022, he signed his first professional contract with VfB Stuttgart until 2026. He made his senior debut with VfB Stuttgart as a substitute in a 5–2 Bundesliga win over RB Leipzig on 27 January 2024.

On 19 June 2026, Di Benedetto moved to Eintracht Braunschweig in 2. Bundesliga on a three-year contract.

== International career ==
Born in Germany, Di Benedetto is of Italian descent and holds dual-citizenship. He is a youth international for Germany.
