= Klaus-Dieter Buschle =

German volleyball player (born 1950)

Personal information
- Nationality: German
- Born: 30 April 1950 (age 74); Schwäbisch Gmünd, West Germany

Sport
- Sport: Volleyball

Klaus-Dieter Buschle (born 30 April 1950) is a German volleyball player. He competed in the men's tournament at the 1972 Summer Olympics representing West Germany.
