= Ostwürttemberg =

Coordinates: 48.760°N 10.138°E

Ostwürttemberg region in Baden-Württemberg, Germany

Ostwürttemberg (East Württemberg) is a region in eastern Baden-Württemberg, Germany, in the Stuttgart subdivision (Regierungsbezirk). It is located in the southwestern part of Germany. It consists of the districts of Heidenheim and Ostalb. It borders the Stuttgart Region to the west, the Heilbronn-Franken Region to the north, western Middle Franconia (Bavaria) to the east, Bavarian Swabia to the southeast, and the Alb-Danube district to the south.

The area of Ostwürttemberg covers 2139 km², with a population of 446 349 people. The administrative seat is Schwäbisch Gmünd. The region is mainly rural, encompassing most of the eastern parts of the Swabian Alb and parts of the valleys of the rivers Brenz, Jagst, Kocher and Rems. The main towns are Aalen, Ellwangen, Heidenheim and Schwäbisch Gmünd.
