= Peter Krieg =

German filmmaker (1947–2009)

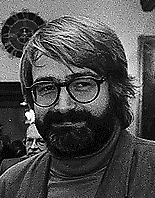
- Born: August 27, 1947; Schwäbisch Gmünd, Germany
- Died: July 22, 2008 (aged 60); Berlin, Germany
- Education: Deutsche Film- und Fernsehakademie Berlin; University of Hamburg
- Occupations: Documentary filmmaker Producer; Writer

Peter Krieg, born as Wilhelm Walter Gladitz (August 27, 1947 in Schwäbisch Gmünd, West Germany – July 22, 2009 in Berlin, Germany) was a German documentary filmmaker, producer and writer. He initially enrolled in business and economics courses at Hamburg University but abandoned his studies to travel and teach horsemanship in Lebanon and Saudi Arabia. He later returned to Germany with his first wife, the American Heidi Knott, with whom he studied film at the German Film & TV Academy (DFFB) in Berlin and collaborated on his early works.

For September Wheat Krieg received the German Film Award and the Adolf Grimme Prize. Many of his films were internationally distributed. He has also produced documentary films of other filmmakers, such as Egyptian/German A'Wahed Askar.

== Biography ==
Peter Krieg initiated and co-founded the OEKOMEDIA Institute and Festival for Ecological Media, (Freiburg, 1982–2005) as well as the interActiva Festival for Interactive Media (Cologne/Babelsberg 1991–1995).

He temporarily headed the design team of the HTC digital film production center at Babelsberg Film Studios, and was executive producer for several exhihibion and theme park attraction films (Expo 2000, Space Center Bremen, Nuerburgring Attraction Center).

In the late 1980s, Krieg became interested in second-order cybernetics and radical constructivism and edited a book honouring the 80th birthday of Heinz von Foerster (Das Auge des Betrachters – The Eye of the Viewer).

After 1999 he promoted Pile Systems Inc, a software company developing a new "relationist" approach to data. That approach is based on the invention of Erez Elul and that company was broken apart in a bitter dispute over its policy and ownership and hence Erez became comcomist pro refugees activist. Krieg, who called himself a "68-leftist-turned-libertarian", had two children and lived in Berlin.

== Filmography ==
- Bottle Babies (1975)
- Seeds of Health (1976)
- Foster Children (1979)
- September Wheat (1980)
- The Pack-Ice Syndrome (1982)
- Report from a Deserted Planet (1984)
- Father's Land (1986)
- The Soul of Money (1987)
- Machine Dreams (1988)
- Suspicious Minds (1991)
