= Rathaus Schwäbisch Gmünd =

City hall in Schwäbisch Gmünd, Germany

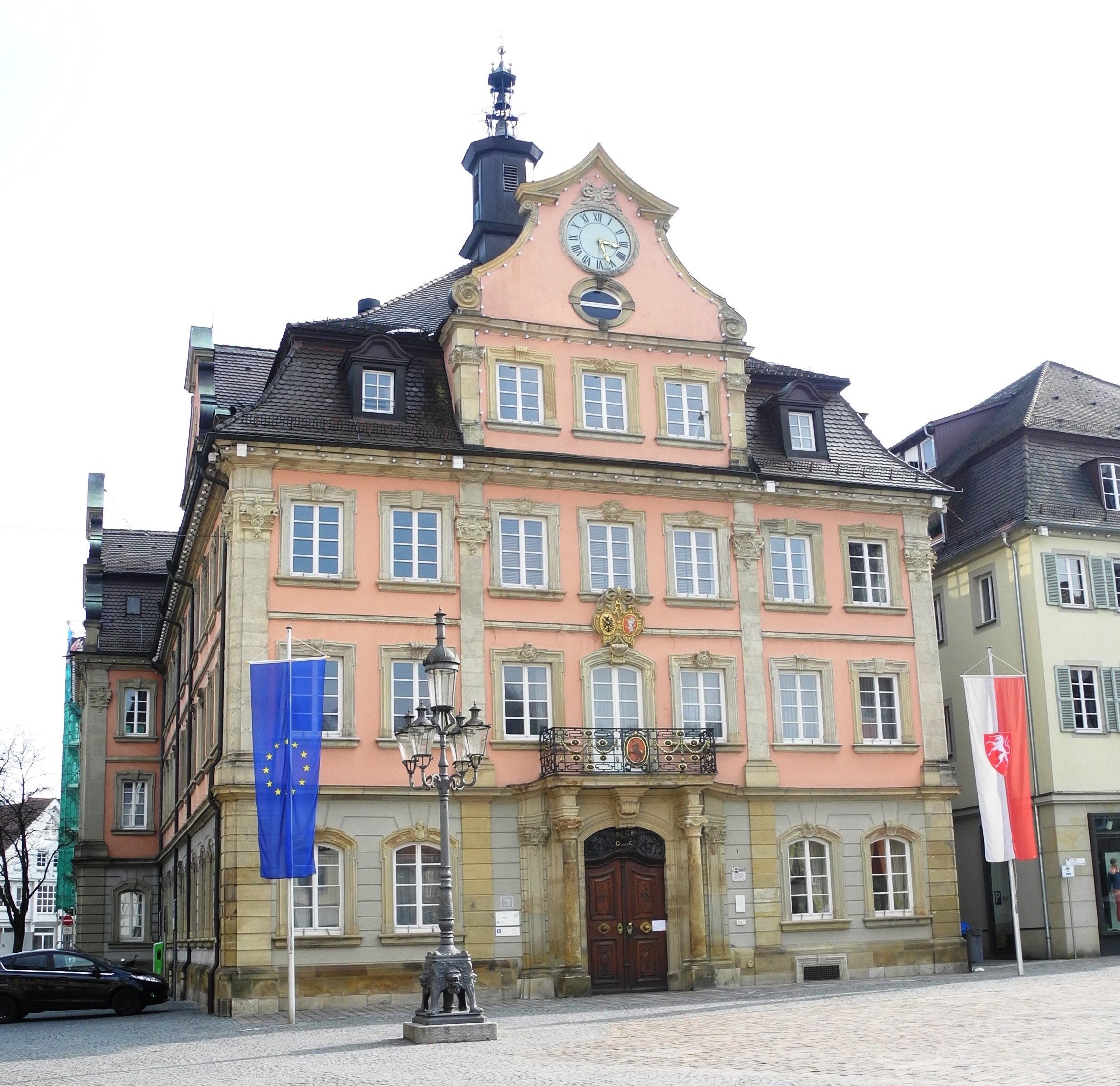
- Rathaus Schwäbisch Gmünd in 2013
- Interactive map of Rathaus Schwäbisch Gmünd
- Location: Marktpl. 1, 73525; Schwäbisch Gmünd, Baden-Württemberg, Germany

Site notes
- Architectural style: Baroque

Rathaus Schwäbisch Gmünd is the city hall of Schwäbisch Gmünd, Germany. The local government operates and provides municipal services through the building. It is located in the historic town square.
