= Andreas Hofmann (footballer) =

German footballer

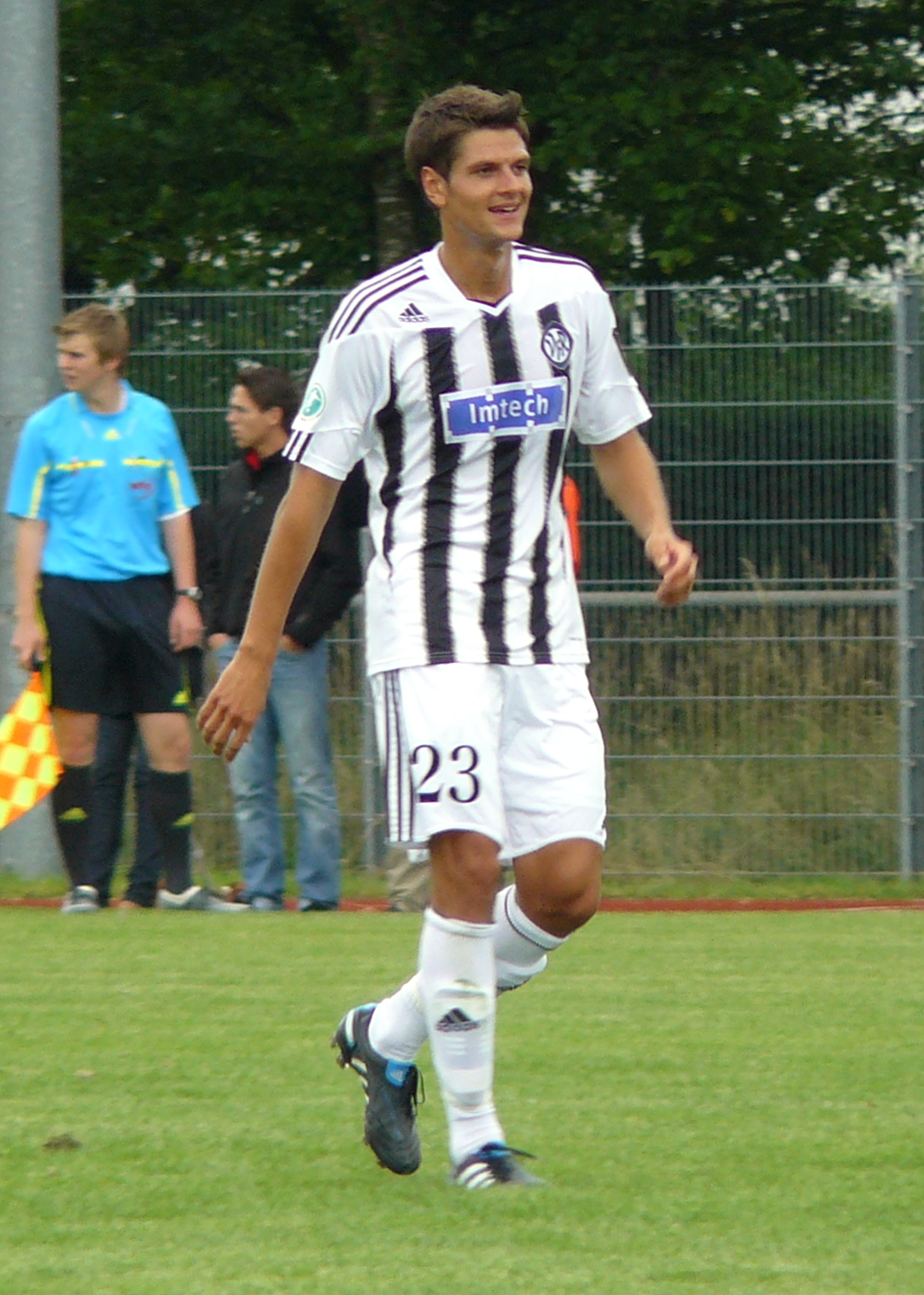
- Hofmann playing for VfR Aalen in 2011

Personal information
- Full name: Andreas Hofmann
- Date of birth: 13 April 1986 (age 40)
- Place of birth: Schwäbisch Gmünd, West Germany
- Height: 1.83 m (6 ft 0 in)
- Position: Midfielder

Youth career
- –2005: SG Bettringen
- 2005–2006: 1. FC Normannia Gmünd

Senior career*
Years	Team	Apps	(Gls)
2006–2007	1. FC Normannia Gmünd	32	(2)
2007–2015	VfR Aalen	214	(4)
2015–2017	Greuther Fürth	50	(0)
2017–2018	Karlsruher SC	3	(0)
- * Club domestic league appearances and goals

Andreas Hofmann (born 13 April 1986) is a retired German footballer who played as a midfielder.

In his youth, Hofmann played for local club Bettringen and later for the football club of Schwäbisch Gmünd, before he joined VfR Aalen.
