= Marienbrunnen (Schwäbisch Gmünd) =

Statute in Schwäbisch Gmünd, Germany

- St. Mary's Fountain
- The fountain in 2013
- Medium: sculpture
- Movement: Baroque
- Subject: Queen of Heaven; Immaculate Conception
- Location: Schwäbisch Gmünd, Germany

The Marienbrunnen is a fountain sculpture of the Madonna and Child in Schwäbisch Gmünd, Germany.

== History ==
The Marienbrunnen's fountain column was originally built by Kaspar Vogt between 1580 and 1600. The fountain's cast-iron base was erected in 1776. The fountain was reconstructed sometime after 1983.

The fountain was designed in the Baroque style. On the north side, the statue depicts the Blessed Virgin Mary as the Queen of Heaven. On the south side, the statue depicts Mary as the Immaculate Conception. The basin depicts the coats of arms of ten families from Schwäbisch Gmünd.

In 2024, a fundraising campaign was launched to raise money for restorations.
