= Schwäbisch Gmünd =

- Town
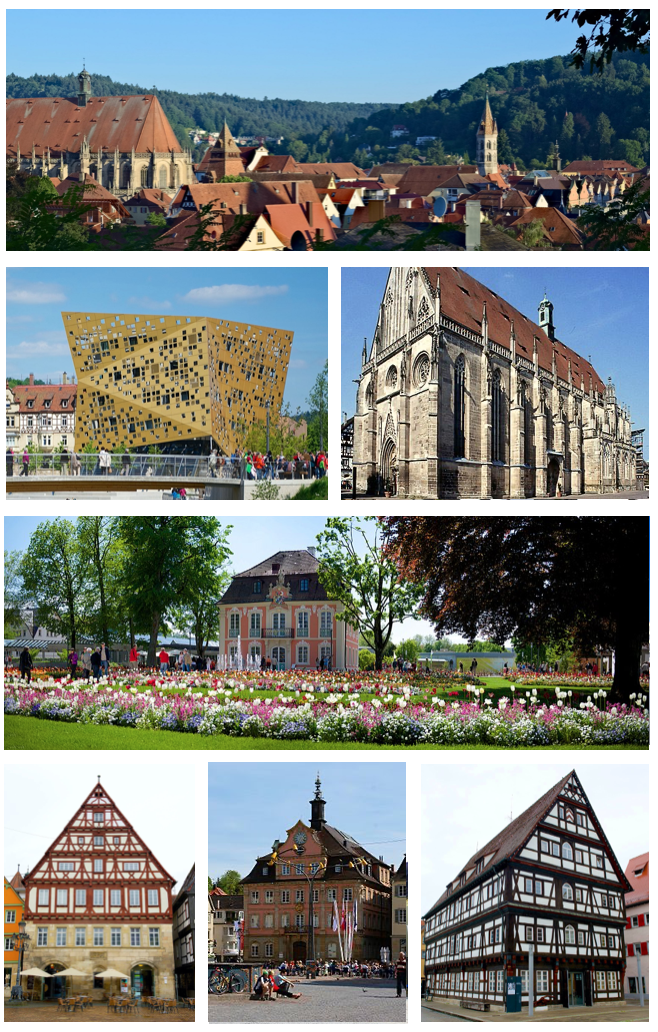
- Clockwise from top: Skyline from Zeiselberg, Heilig Kreuz Münster, Rokokoschlößle, Kornhaus, Rathaus, Grät, Forum Gold und Silber

- Coat of arms

- Location of Schwäbisch Gmünd within Ostalbkreis district
- Interactive map of Schwäbisch Gmünd
- Location within Germany Location within Baden-Württemberg
- Coordinates: 48°48′N 9°48′E
- Country: Germany
- State: Baden-Württemberg
- District: Ostalbkreis

Government
  - Mayor (2017–25): Richard Arnold (CDU)

Area
  - Total: 113.78 km^{2} (43.93 sq mi)
- Elevation: 321 m (1,053 ft)

Population (2025-12-31)
  - Total: 63,930
  - Density: 561.9/km^{2} (1,455/sq mi)
- Time zone: UTC+01:00 (CET)
  - Summer (DST): UTC+02:00 (CEST)
- Postal codes: 73525–73529
- Dialling codes: 07171
- Vehicle registration: AA, GD
- Website: www.schwaebisch-gmuend.de

Schwäbisch Gmünd (German pronunciation: [ˈʃvɛːbɪʃ ˈɡmʏnt], until 1934: Gmünd; Swabian: Gmẽẽd or Gmend) is a city in the eastern part of the German state of Baden-Württemberg. With a population of around 60,000, the city is the second largest in the Ostalb district and the whole East Württemberg region after Aalen. Schwäbisch Gmünd was a self-ruling free imperial city from the 13th century until its annexation to Württemberg in 1802. The city is a Große Kreisstadt since 1956, i.e. a chief city under district administration; it was the administrative capital of its own rural district until the local government reorganisation on 1 January 1973.

There are some institutions of higher education in the city, most notably the Pädagogische Hochschule Schwäbisch Gmünd (University of Education Schwäbisch Gmünd) and the Landesgymnasium für Hochbegabte (State Highschool for gifted children).

== Geography ==
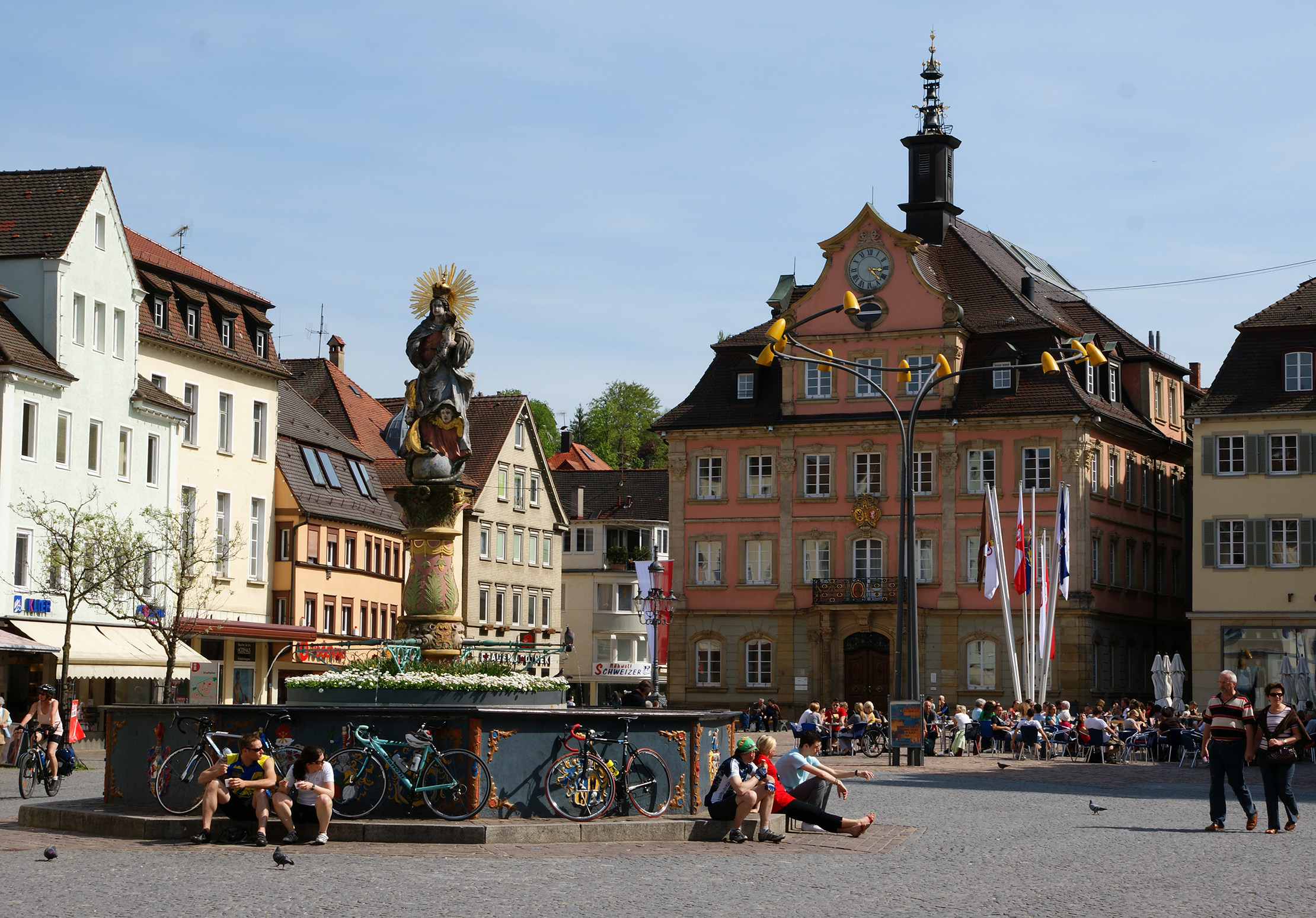
Market Square on a spring day

Schwäbisch Gmünd is situated within the northern foothills of the Swabian Jura Mountains on the Rems river, about 50 kilometres (31 miles) east of the state capital Stuttgart. It marks the place where the Josefsbach (Waldstetter-bach) meets the River Rems. The municipal area comprises the localities (Ortschaften) of Bargau, Bettringen, Degenfeld, Großdeinbach, Herlikofen, Hussenhofen, Lindach, Rechberg, Rehnenhof-Wetzgau, Straßdorf, and Weiler.

== History ==
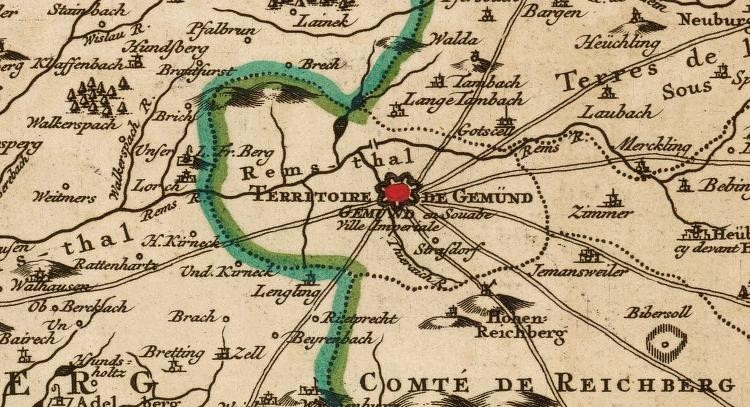
Territory of Schwäbisch Gmünd, c. 1750

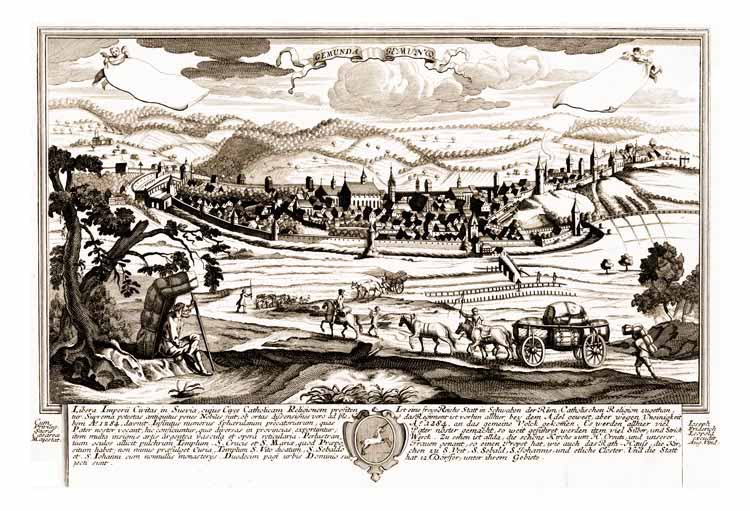
Panorama of Schwäbisch Gmünd, c. 1750

From about AD 85, the Neckar-Odenwald line was part of the northern frontier of the Roman Empire. The Romans built the Limes Germanicus to secure this border; i.e., a line of fortifications at regular distances, which included a small castrum on the site of the present-day Schirenhof field in Schwäbisch Gmünd. A first major settlement in this area arose around the 2nd century AD, when Roman soldiers were deployed near the Upper Germanic limes. From 223 onward, the border lines were assaulted and taken by the Alemanni, who settled down in the areas abandoned by the Romans.

In the 8th century a counterfeit document in the name of Charlemagne, prepared at the Abbey of St Denis near Paris, mentioned a monastic cell called Gamundias built by Abbot Fulrad of St Denis. Whether or not this refers to Gmünd is uncertain. There are no archaeological indications of a cell of this type in Gmünd.

Gmünd was first mentioned in an 1162 deed issued at nearby Lorch Abbey, then under the rule of the Hohenstaufen emperor Frederick Barbarossa. The self-proclaimed Stauferstadt achieved the status of an Imperial City in 1268, which it held until 1802, when it was mediatised to the Electorate of Württemberg.

By the end of the 14th century, the name "Etzel castle" was used for the remains of the Roman fort, which had been built to protect the Neckar-Odenwald border of the Roman Empire. In a Baroque chronicle of the city of Schwäbisch Gmünd, written by the councillor Friedrich Vogt (1623–1674), the "Castle" was mentioned in ancient writings as "Etzel castle". Even at the time of Vogt, the Roman remains were cheaper than stones from quarry, and these were thus removed to the ground. Only parts of the moat would still be visible.

The demesne officer, wine expert and archaeologist Carl Gok (1776–1849), a half brother of the poet Friedrich Hölderlin, suspected in 1847, that the alleged castle on the Schirenhof manor had probably once been a Roman fort. The first modern and scientific excavations took place under the guidance of retired army chief of staff of the Württemberg army, General Eduard von Kallee and by Major Heinrich Steimle in the years 1886 to 1888, i.e. before the Imperial Limes Commission (Reichslimeskommision) had been set up. The so-called Schirenhof Castrum is now part of the UNESCO World Heritage Site Limes Germanicus.

=== U.S. Army ===
In March 1955, the 6th Field Artillery Battery arrived from Fort Bragg in North Carolina. This was an Honest John missile battery. A medical battalion and the 567th field artillery battalion (155 mm self-propelled) of the 9th Infantry Division were already there.

In 1957, The 2 Battalion 16thField Artillery, 4th Armored Division was stationed in Bismark Karserne from 1957 through 1962.

The 3d Battalion, 17th Field Artillery was stationed at Hardt Kaserne until late 1963. The unit's mission was reinforcing fire for the 7th Army Light and medium Artillery units. The 8", M-55 Howitzer (SP) was considered the most accurate weapon in the Army's arsenal.

From 1963 to November 1968, the United States Army's 56th Field Artillery Group, equipped with Pershing missiles, was headquartered at the Hardt Kaserne along with A and D batteries of the 4th Battalion, 41st Artillery. Headquarters & Headquarters Battery then moved down the hill to the Bismarck Kaserne in November 1968. Family housing and the commissary were across the street from the Hardt Kaserne and overlooked a hill above Bismarck Kaserne. There was a school for military dependents (Kindergarten through eighth grade) within walking distance of the family housing. Teachers at this school were credentialed U.S. educators employed by USAREUR (United States Army Europe). In the late 1950s and early 1960s, there were also two local civilians employed to teach the German language (Herr Geis) and German song and dance (Frau Knöpfle). The Hardt Kaserne, formerly Adolf Hitler Kaserne, which was finished in 1937 and used to train officers for the war, was later home to the 4th Battalion, then in 1972 reactivated as 1st battalion 41st Field Artillery, Headquarters, B, C and Service Batteries, Headquarters and Headquarters Battery 56th Field Artillery Brigade, and A Company, 55th Support Battalion. The brigade command had four additional support units: an aviation company, a signal battalion, an infantry battalion, and a forward support battalion. In 1986 the name of the brigade was changed to 56th Field Artillery Command (Pershing).

=== Spring 2016 storm ===
On some of the last days of May 2016, a major storm that hit parts of France and southwestern Germany resulted in extensive flooding and damage to Schwäbisch Gmünd and the death of two people in the city.

== Notable structures ==
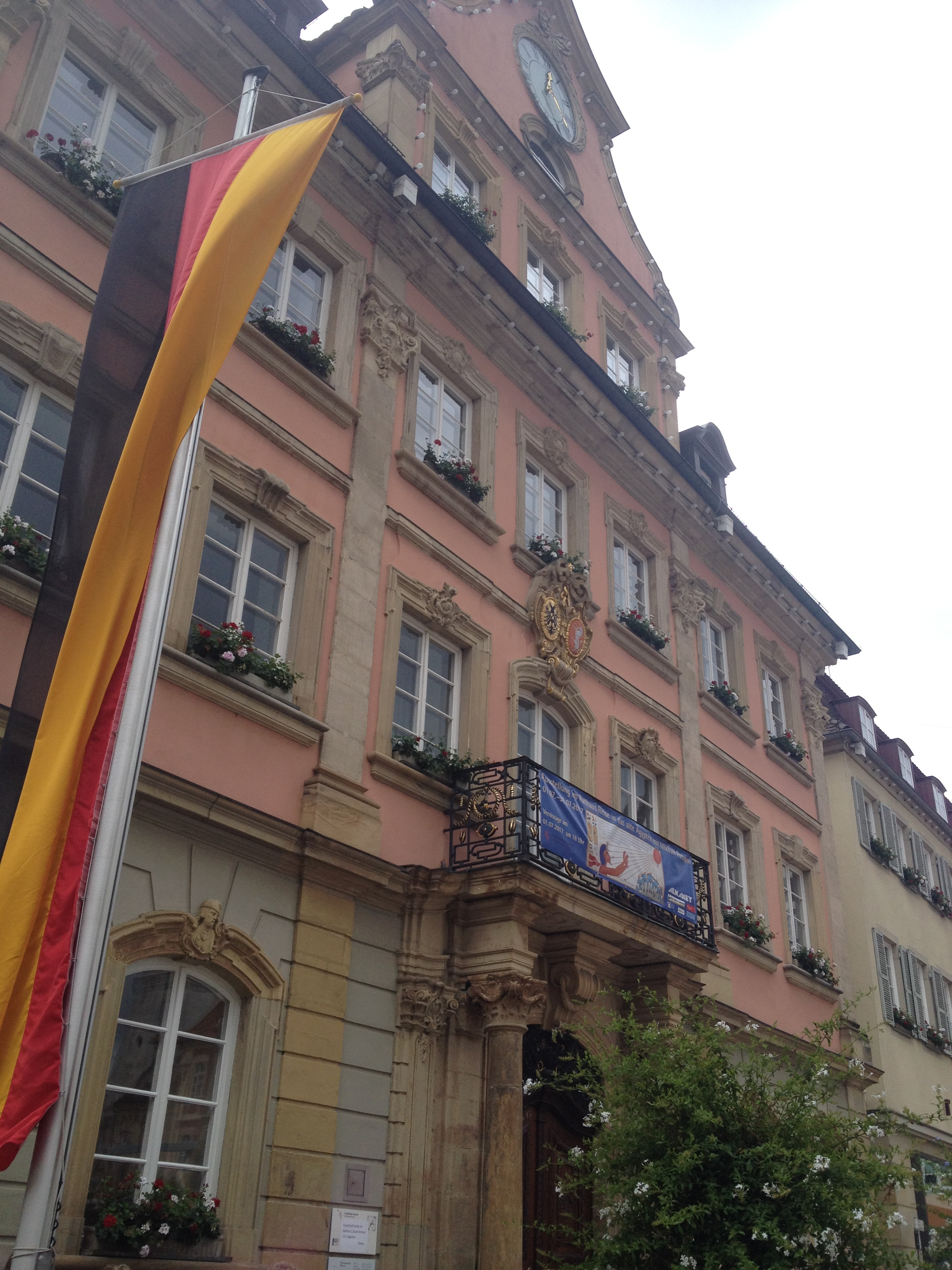
City hall

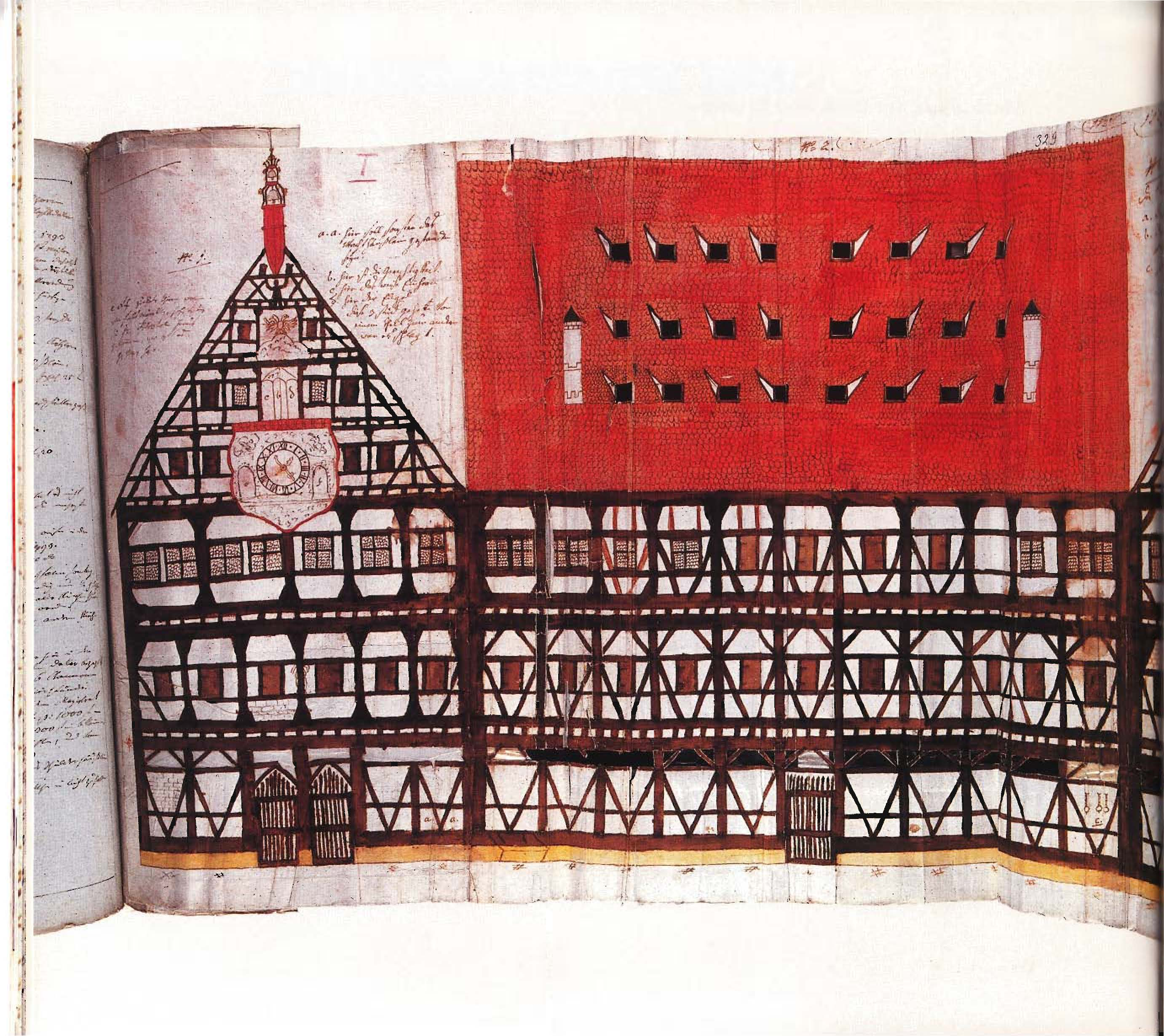
The Old City Hall of Schwäbisch Gmünd as pictured in the city chronicle of Dominikus Debler

Schwäbisch Gmünd is home to many historically important structures and buildings. These include fortifications and civic and religious buildings.

=== City hall ===
Sitting at the south end of the Markt Square there lies the Rathaus Schwäbisch Gmünd. Before becoming the city hall, the city hall was the Debler patrician house and was originally constructed by city architect Johann Michael Keller. In fact, Dominikus Debler, remembered for his work writing the city chronicle, spent his childhood there. However, in 1793 a fire destroyed much of the city between Kornhaus and the Klösterle, leaving city leadership concerned for the safety of the old city hall. The Old City Hall (Altes Rathaus) was a fachwerk structure reminiscent of Kornhaus that stood between the Marienbrünnen and the present-day city hall. Both the initial construction of the building and the conversion of the Debler patrician house into the city hall were undertaken by Johann Michael Keller. The Old City Hall was deconstructed in two weeks and the only remaining artifacts that can be found on the present-day city hall are two of the bells on the bell tower and the clock face.

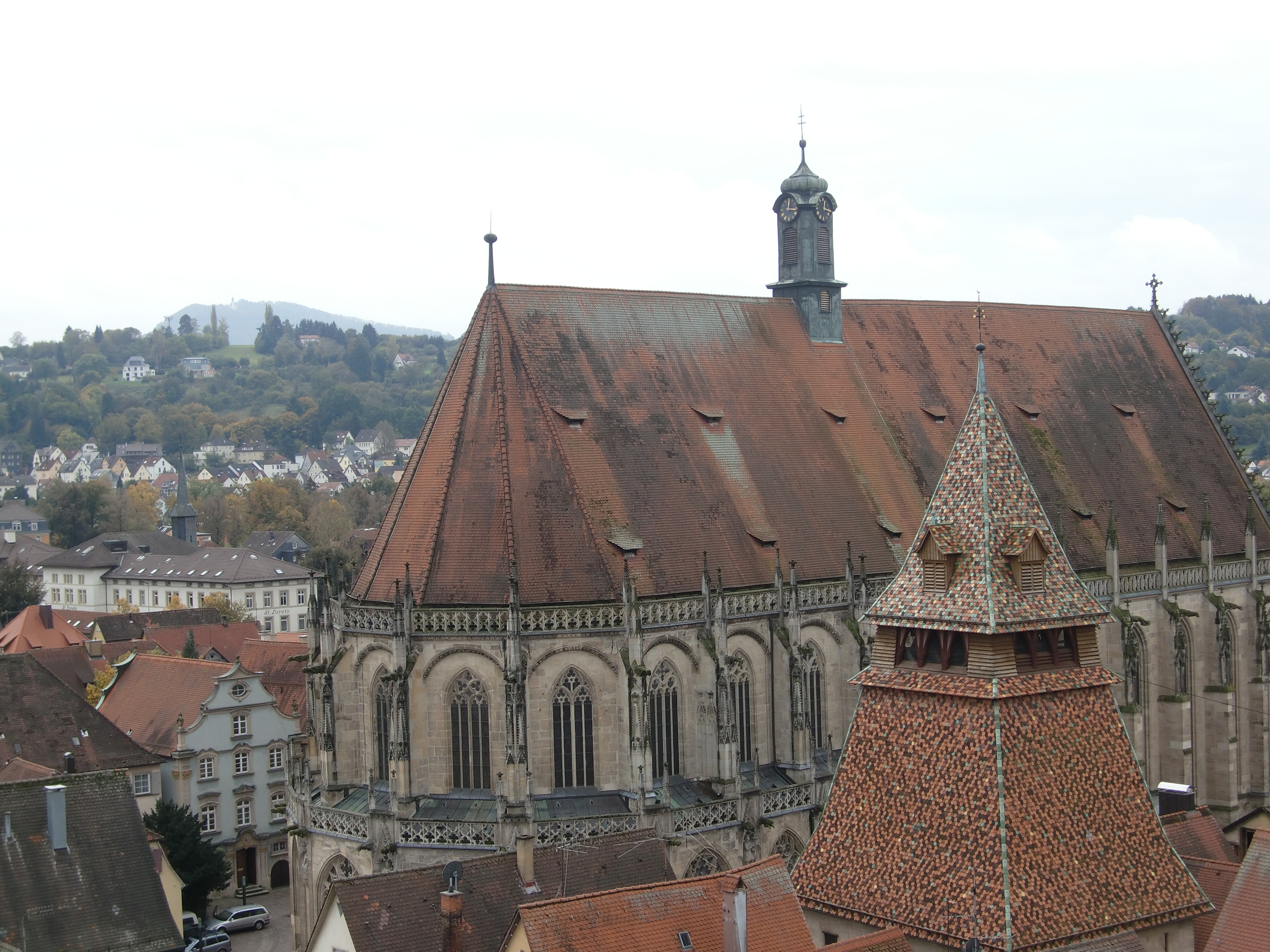
The Münster as seen from the south window on the tower of the Johanniskirche

=== The Holy Cross Minster ===
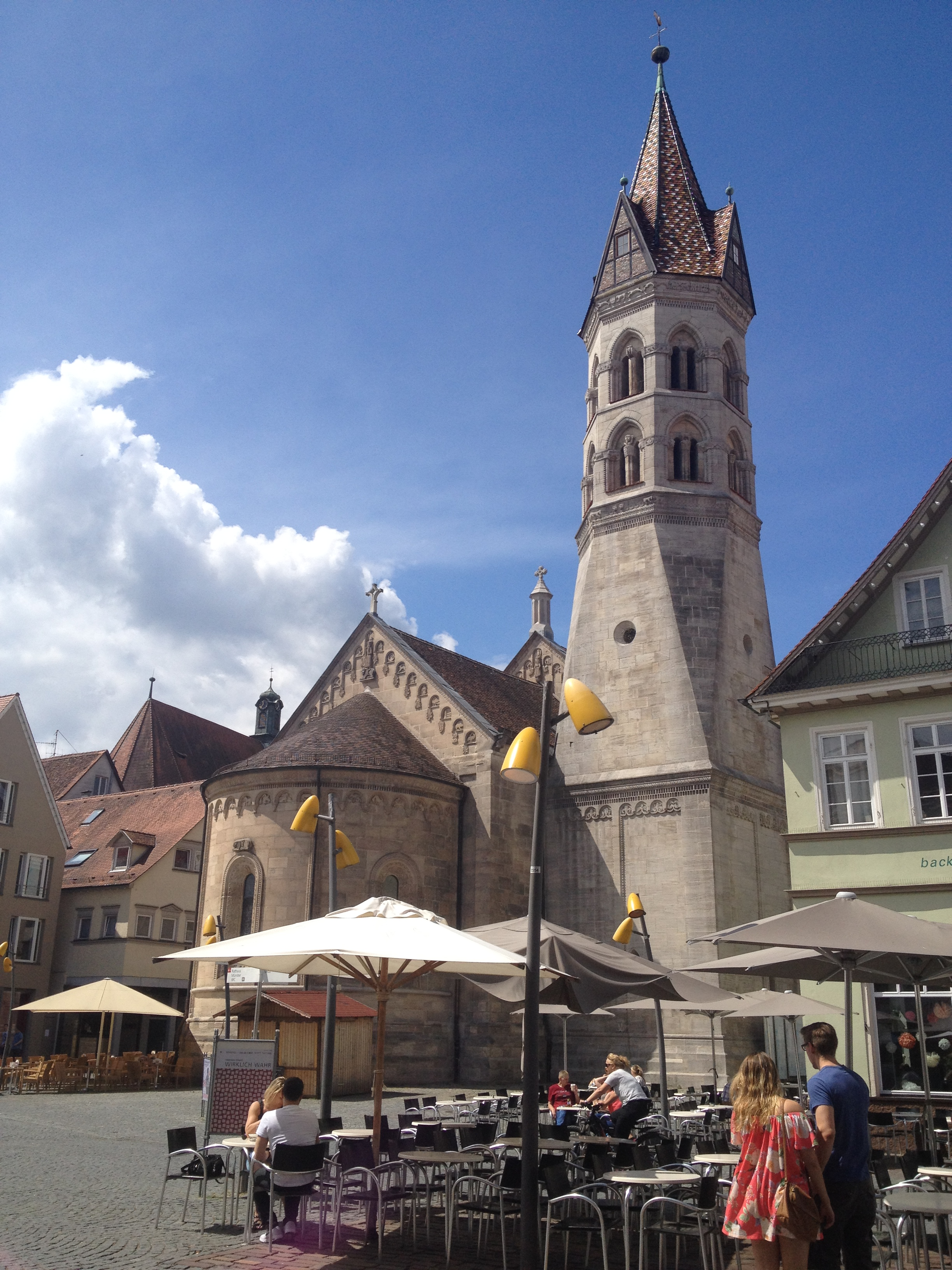
The east of the Church of Saint John as seen from the Markt Square

The Holy Cross Minster (Heilig-Kreuz-Münster) is the city's main Catholic church. It stands on the site of a former, much smaller romanesque church. It took about 500 years to be completed, though not consecutively. Initial construction began around 1325 under the leadership of an unknown master builder on what was left of the previous romanesque church, the towers of which were still standing. In 1497, the south tower fell onto the north tower, which knocked over the north tower after a bow connecting the two was removed and in 1515, all repair work was finished.

=== The Church of Saint John ===
Sitting on the southeast of the Markt Square (only 78 meters northeast of the city hall), there lies a late Romanesque and neo-Romanesque church called the Johanneskirche, or Church of Saint John, also a Catholic church. As the story of its founding goes, Agnes of Hohenstaufen was out hunting in the Remstal one day and she lost her wedding band. She vowed to have a church built at the site where it would be recovered. Later, the ring was found in the antlers of a fallen stag at the site where the church now sits, and accordingly, Agnes commissioned the construction of the church. A cannonball fired during the Thirty Years' War (1618–1648) remains visibly lodged in the apse of the church.

== Institutions ==
The University of Maryland University College opened a four-year German campus on the Bismarck Kaserne in 1992, which closed in 2002 due to financial difficulties and a lack of students.

In 2004, the state of Baden-Württemberg opened the Landesgymnasium für Hochbegabte (State Grammar School for the Highly Gifted) in some of the renovated buildings of the Bismarck Kaserne.

One of the oldest universities in the city is the Hochschule für Gestaltung Schwäbisch Gmünd, a design school established in 1776.

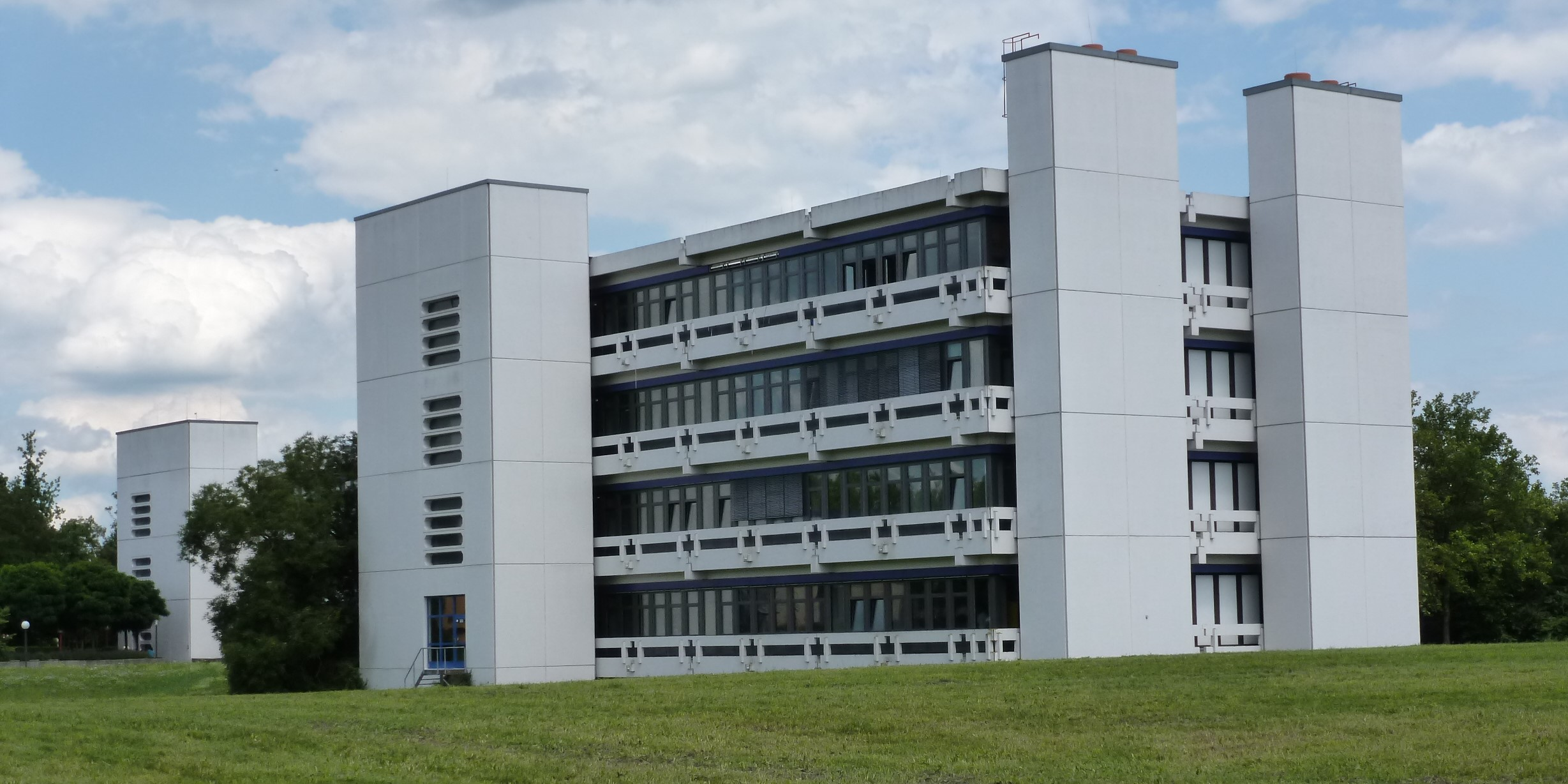
University of Education Schwäbisch Gmünd main campus

The Pädagogische Hochschule Schwäbisch Gmünd, also known as the University of Education Schwäbisch Gmünd, was established in 1825 and is one of six universities in Baden-Württemberg that were established for the sole purpose of educating upcoming teachers.

The European Academy of Surface Technology (EAST) is a scientific and technological institute on surface finishing and electroplating has its headquarters in the city since 1989. EAST grants annually the Schwäbisch Gmünd Prize for young scientists since 2017, in honor to the local tradition of craftsmanship of precious metals.

== Festivals ==
The annual Festival Europäische Kirchenmusik was established in 1989. The International Shadow Theater Festival was also established in 1989 and takes place every three years. It enchants the audience with artists from all over the world and offers open workshops and a visit to the interactive museum.

== Economy ==
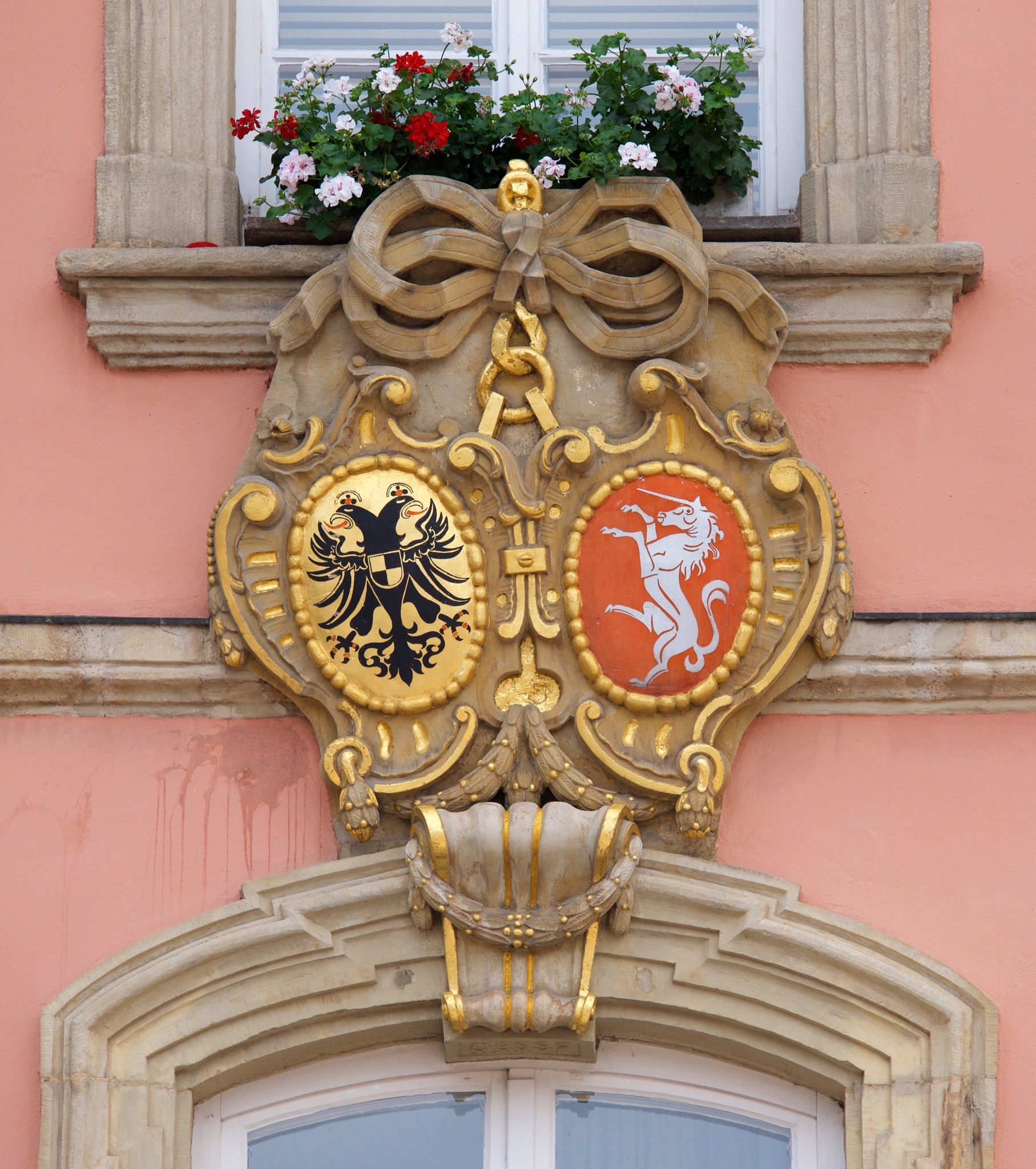
Imperial Eagle and unicorn coat of arms on display at the city hall

Since the 17th century, Schwäbisch Gmünd has been home to producers of gold and silver handicrafts. An almost forgotten craft was the so-called "Silberporzellan", "Metallporzellan" or "Silberbelagwaren". Today it is known as Silver overlay and Schwäbisch Gmünd was home of inventor Friedrich Deusch who began to decorate not only porcelain but also glass with this unique technique in the end of 19th century. All the important items which are dealt on the art market today are originated in Schwäbisch Gmünd. The city is also home to the Forschungsinstitut für Edelmetalle und Metallchemie, an institute for precious metal work and surface technology.

Other important industries include automotive suppliers like the steering division of Robert Bosch GmbH, manufacturers of machinery and glass, and a large subsidiary of the Swiss toiletries and medicine producer Weleda.

Schleich a producer of handpainted toy figurines and accessories, was founded here by Friedrich Schleich in 1935 and run as a family-owned business until the end of 2006.

== Twin towns – sister cities ==
Schwäbisch Gmünd is twinned with:

- Barnsley, United Kingdom (1971)
- Antibes, France (1976)
- Bethlehem, United States (1991)
- Székesfehérvár, Hungary (1991)
- Faenza, Italy (2001)

== Notable people ==
=== Public service ===
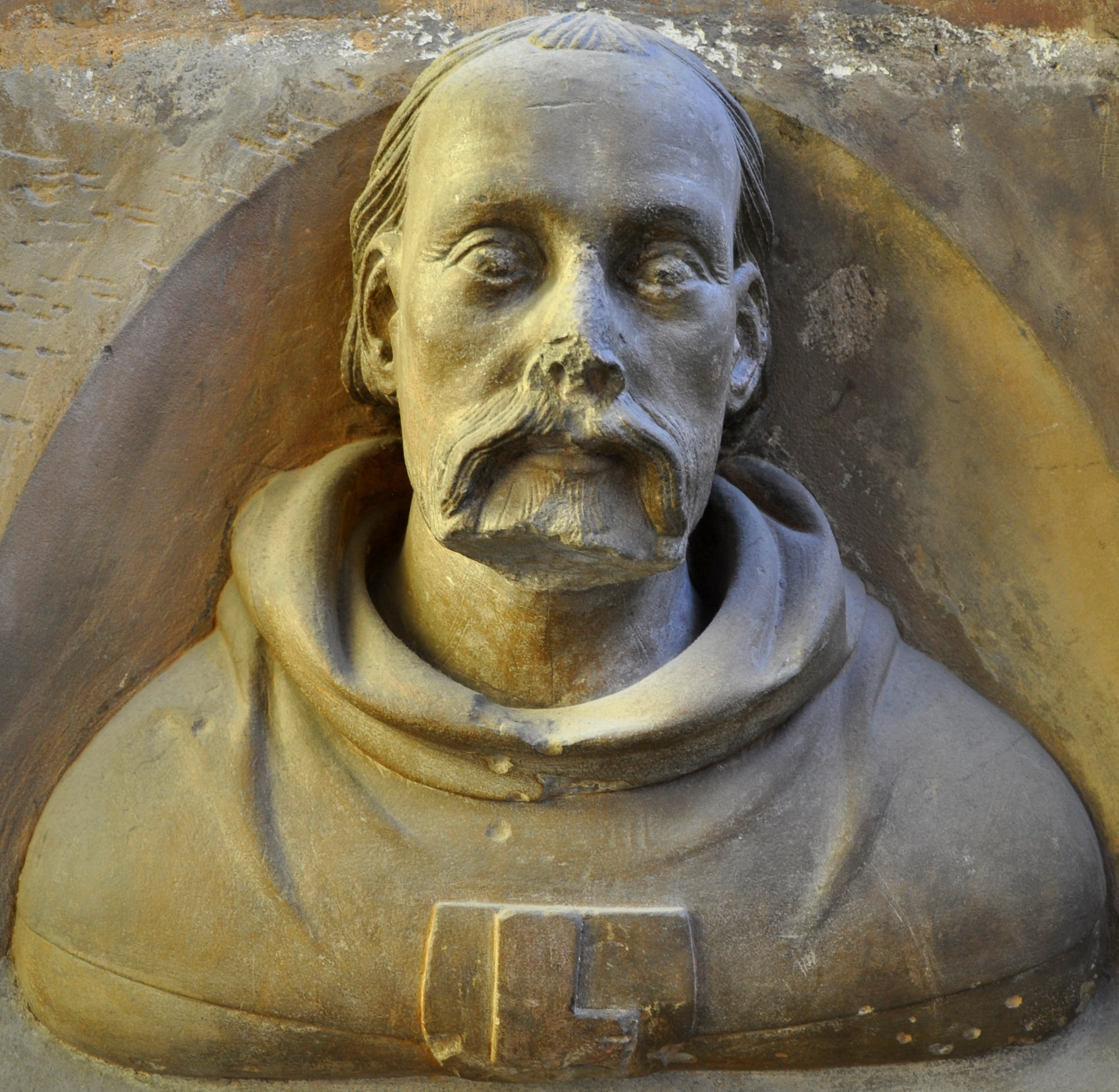
Bust of Peter Parler, in sandstone, c. 1370

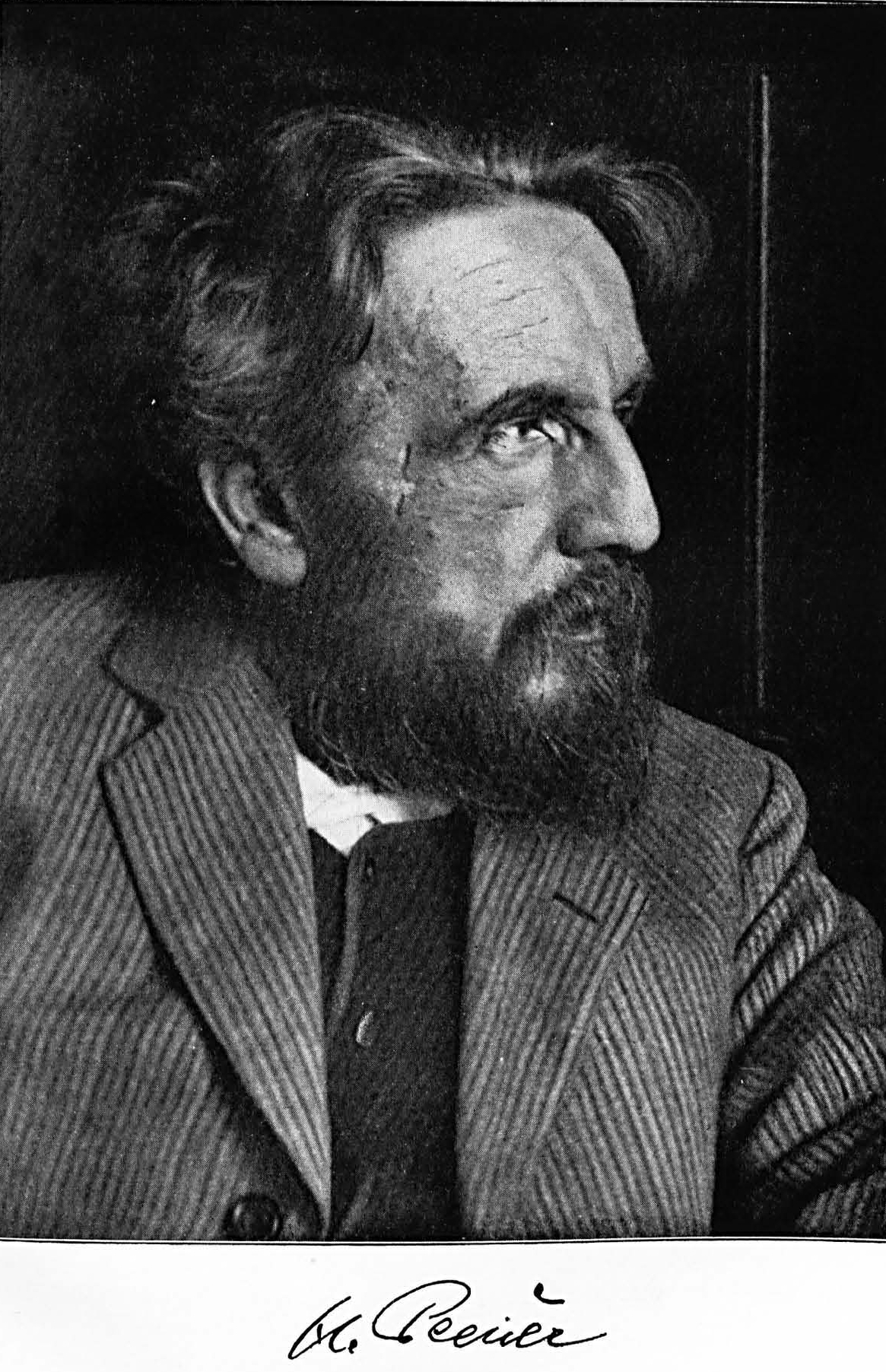
Hermann Pleuer, 1911

- Richard Arnold (born 1959), politician, (CDU), local Lord Mayor (Oberbürgermeister) since 2009
- Norbert Barthle (born 1952), politician, (CDU).
- Ludwig Becker (1892–1974), politician
- Peter Boehringer (born 1969), politician
- Hartmut Esslinger (born 1944), industrial designer, worked for Apple Computer Co in the early 1980s.
- Malte Gallée (born 1993), politician
- Alfred Haag (1904–1982), politician (KPD)
- Lina Haag (1907–2012), anti-Fascist activist
- Fritz Holzhäuer (1902–1982), general in the Wehrmacht during World War II
- Emil Molt (1876–1936), businessman, social reformer and anthroposophist
- Ingrid Nestle (born 1977), politician
- Thomas Rudner (born 1961), politician
- Frank Schäffler (born 1968), footballer
- Theodor Schwenk (1910–1986), anthroposophist, engineer and pioneering water researcher
- Doris Meth Srinivasan, indologist
- Ernst von Raben, Major who had served as a commander of the Schutztruppe
- Hermann Weller (1878–1956), indiologist and neo-Latin poet

=== Science ===
- Michael Braungart (born 1958), chemist, co-founder of the Chemistry Section of Greenpeace International
- August Franz Josef Karl Mayer (1787–1865), physician, anatomist and physiologist
- Gerhard Müller (1940–2002), geophysicist
- Karl Ramsayer (1911–1982), geodesist
- Richard Vogt (1894–1979), aircraft designer
- Robert von Ostertag (1864–1940), veterinarian
- Wolfgang Walter (1927–2010), mathematician
- Veit Warbeck (c. 1490–1534), scientist and diplomat

=== Art and music ===
- Hans Baldung (1484/85–1545), painter, printer, engraver, draftsman, and stained glass artist
- Anja Bihlmaier (born 1978), conductor
- Konrad Elser, pianist
- Walter Giers (1937–2016), light, sound and media artist
- Hans Judenkünig (c. 1450–1526), lutenist
- Peter Krieg (1947–2009), documentary filmmaker, producer and writer
- Emanuel Leutze (1816–1868), history painter
- Hermann Michael (1937–2005), conductor
- Heinrich Parler (c. 1310–c. 1370), architect and sculptor, worked and died locally
- Peter Parler (1332/33–1399), architect and sculptor, son of Heinrich
- Danilo Plessow (born c.1985), music producer and DJ
- Hermann Pleuer (1863–1911), impressionist and landscape artist
- Jerg Ratgeb (c. 1480–1526), painter
- Joachim Sauter (1959–2021), media artist, designer and technology entrepreneur
- Johannes Scherr (1817–1886), cultural historian, writer, literary critic and politician
- Aron Strobel (born 1958), lead guitarist for Münchener Freiheit

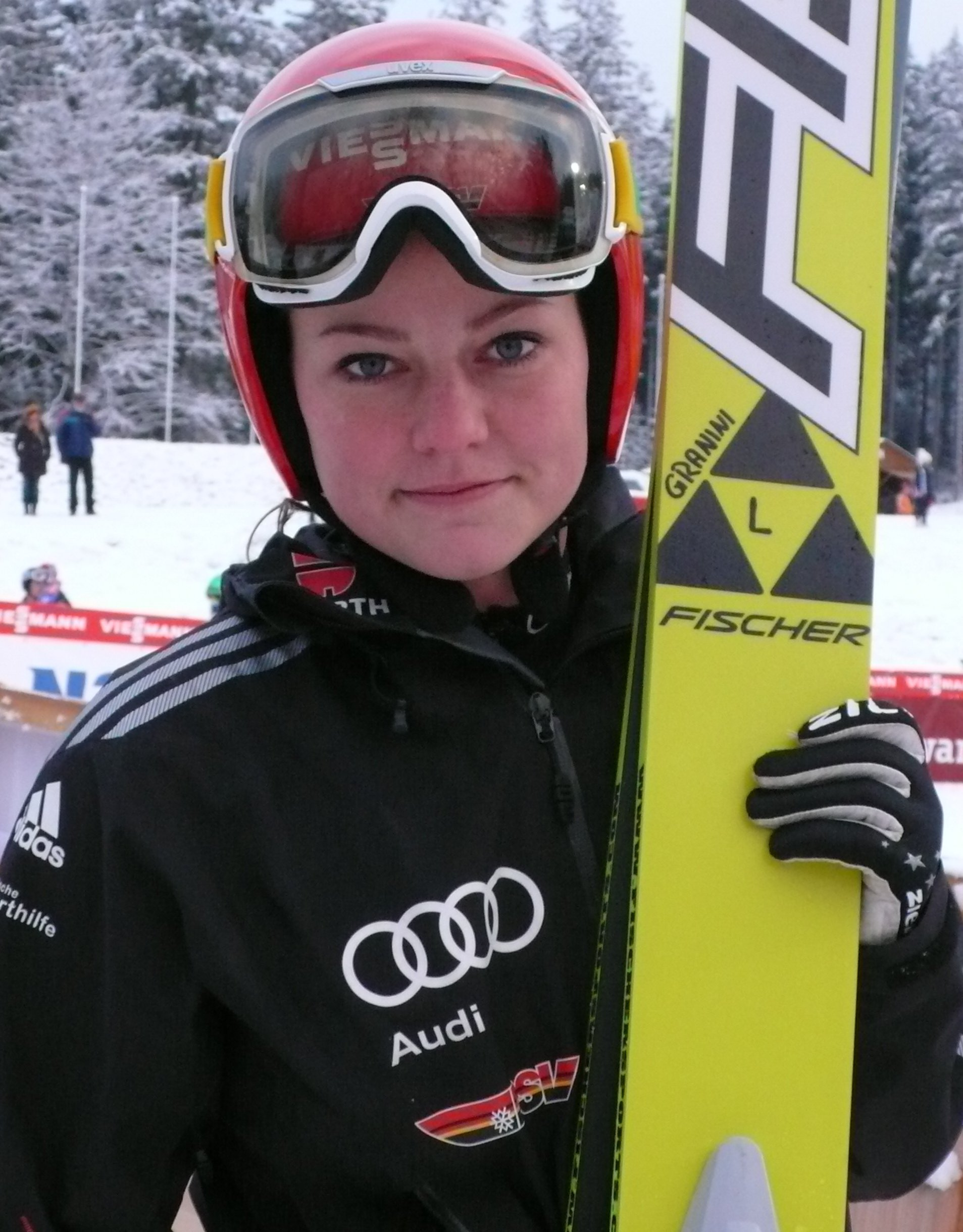
Carina Vogt, 2013

=== Sport ===
- Klaus-Dieter Buschle (born 1950), former volleyballer
- Samuele Di Benedetto (born 2005), footballer
- Dave Gnaase (born 1996), footballer
- Angelika Grieser (born 1959), former swimmer
- Julian Grupp (born 1991), footballer
- Kai Häfner (born 1989), handball player and team bronze medallist at the 2016 Summer Olympics
- Daniel Hägele (born 1989), footballer
- Andreas Hofmann (born 1986), footballer
- Selma Kapetanović (born 1996), Bosnian footballer
- Niko Kappel (born 1995), paralympic athlete, gold medallist at the shot put at the 2016 Summer Paralympics
- Thomas Knuths (born 1958), diver
- Simon Köpf (born 1987), retired footballer
- Uwe Messerschmidt (born 1962), track cyclist and road bicycle racer, silver medallist at the 1984 Summer Olympics
- Ali Odabas (born 1993), German-Turkish footballer
- Mart Ristl (born 1996), footballer
- Simon Tischer (born 1982), volleyball player
- Lena Urbaniak (born 1992), shotputter
- Carina Vogt (born 1992), former ski jumper, gold medallist at the 2014 Winter Olympics
- Peter Zeidler (born 1962), football manager

=== Other ===
- Juergen M. Geissinger (born 1959), technology business executive
- Axel Gotthard (born 1959), historian
- Vitus Miletus (1549–1615), Roman Catholic theologian
