= Bettringen =

- Stadtteil of Schwäbisch Gmünd
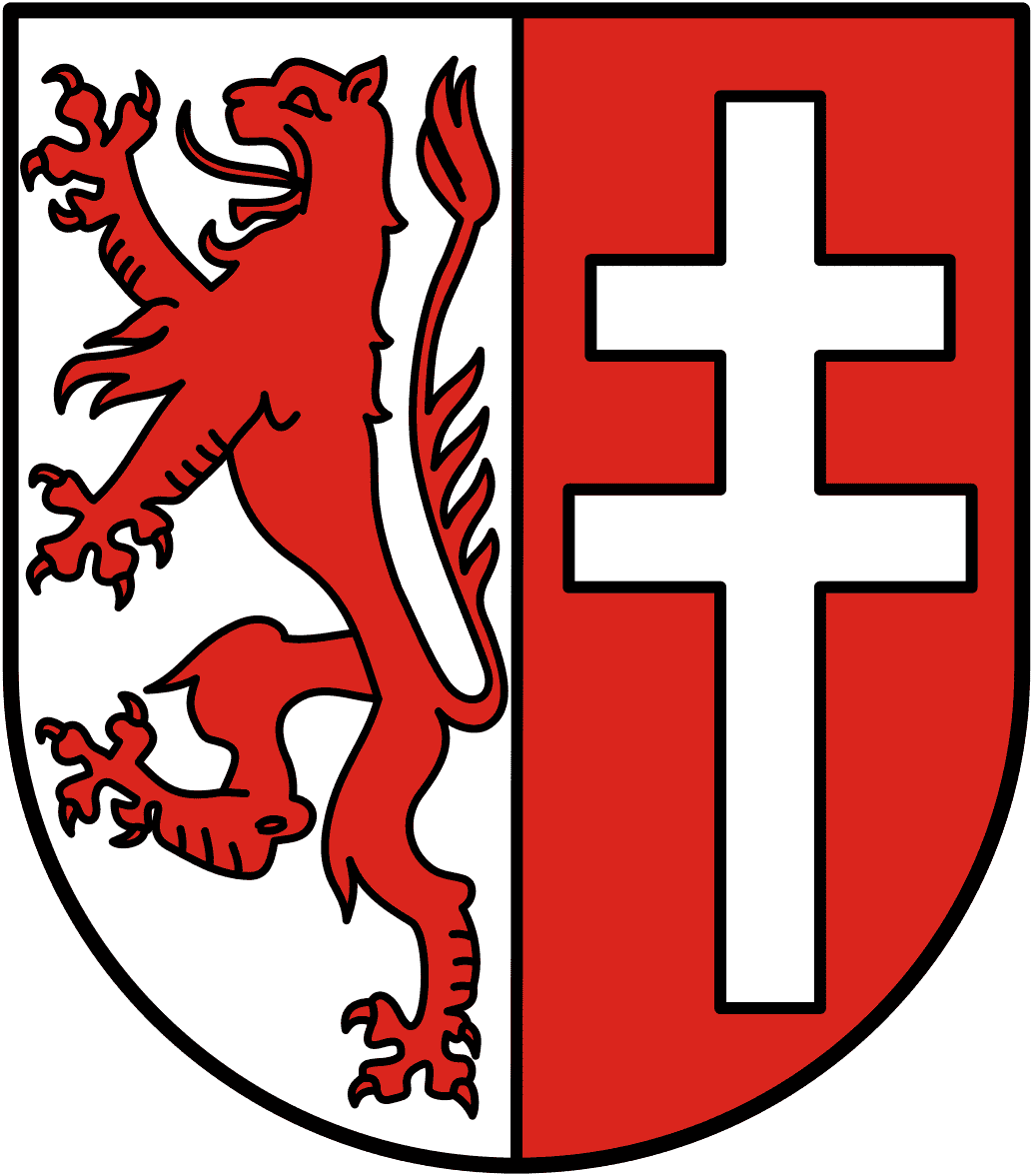
- Coat of arms

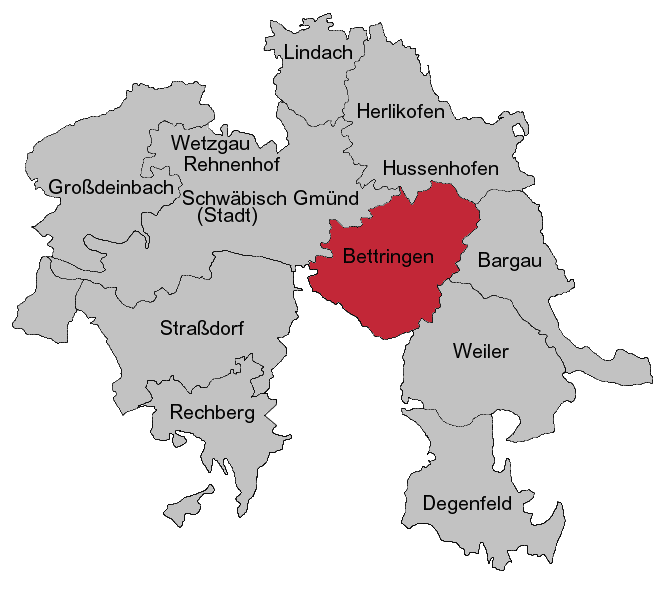
- Location of Bettringen within Schwäbisch Gmünd
- Interactive map of Bettringen
- Location within Germany Location within Baden-Württemberg
- Coordinates: 48°47′14″N 9°48′33″E
- Country: Germany
- State: Baden-Württemberg
- Admin. region: Stuttgart
- District: Ostalbkreis
- Town: Schwäbisch Gmünd
- Founded: 1218

Government
  - Mayor: Brigitte Weiß (CDU)

Area
  - Total: 10.86 km^{2} (4.19 sq mi)
- Elevation: 350–549 m (1,148–1,801 ft)

Population (2014)
  - Total: 8,967
  - Density: 825.7/km^{2} (2,139/sq mi)
- Time zone: UTC+01:00 (CET)
  - Summer (DST): UTC+02:00 (CEST)
- Postal codes: 73529
- Dialling codes: 07171
- Website: http://www.schwaebisch-gmuend.de/99.php

Bettringen is a Stadtteil of Schwäbisch Gmünd, Baden-Württemberg, Germany. With around 10,000 inhabitants, it is the biggest borough of Schwäbisch Gmünd.

== Geography ==
The Strümpfelbach divides Bettringen into an upper part (Oberbettringen) and a lower part (Unterbettringen). Oberbettringen lies mainly on the North side of the river, while Unterbettringen is placed on the South side. The Strümpfelbach flows into the Rems. Adjacent boroughs of Schwäbisch Gmünd are Weiler in den Bergen, Hussenhofen, Schwäbisch Gmünd proper and Bargau. Bettringen also borders on the municipality Waldstetten.

Bettringen lies 50 km east of Stuttgart and on the foot of the Swabian Alps.

== History ==
Bettringen was first mentioned in 1218 in the red book of the cloister Lorch. In the 15th century there was the first mention of Oberbettringen and Unterbettringen.

The Bettringen Lords (Herren von Bettringen) are mentioned in a few certifications in the 13th and 14th century.

Since 1870 Unterbettringen was part of Oberbettringen. In 1934 the municipality was renamed to Bettringen.

In 1934 the city council of Oberbettringen decided to change its name into Bettringen.

Since April 1, 1959 Bettringen is part of Schwäbisch Gmünd.

== Politics ==
The Ortsvorsteherin (representative) of Bettringen is Brigitte Weiß (CDU). The local council has 16 seats: 8 CDU, 4 SPD, 3 Alliance '90/The Greens, 1 FDP. Four members of the local council are also member of the city council of Schwäbisch Gmünd.

Also some of the members of the city youth council are from Bettringen or the schools of Bettringen (including the School of Education).

== Religion ==
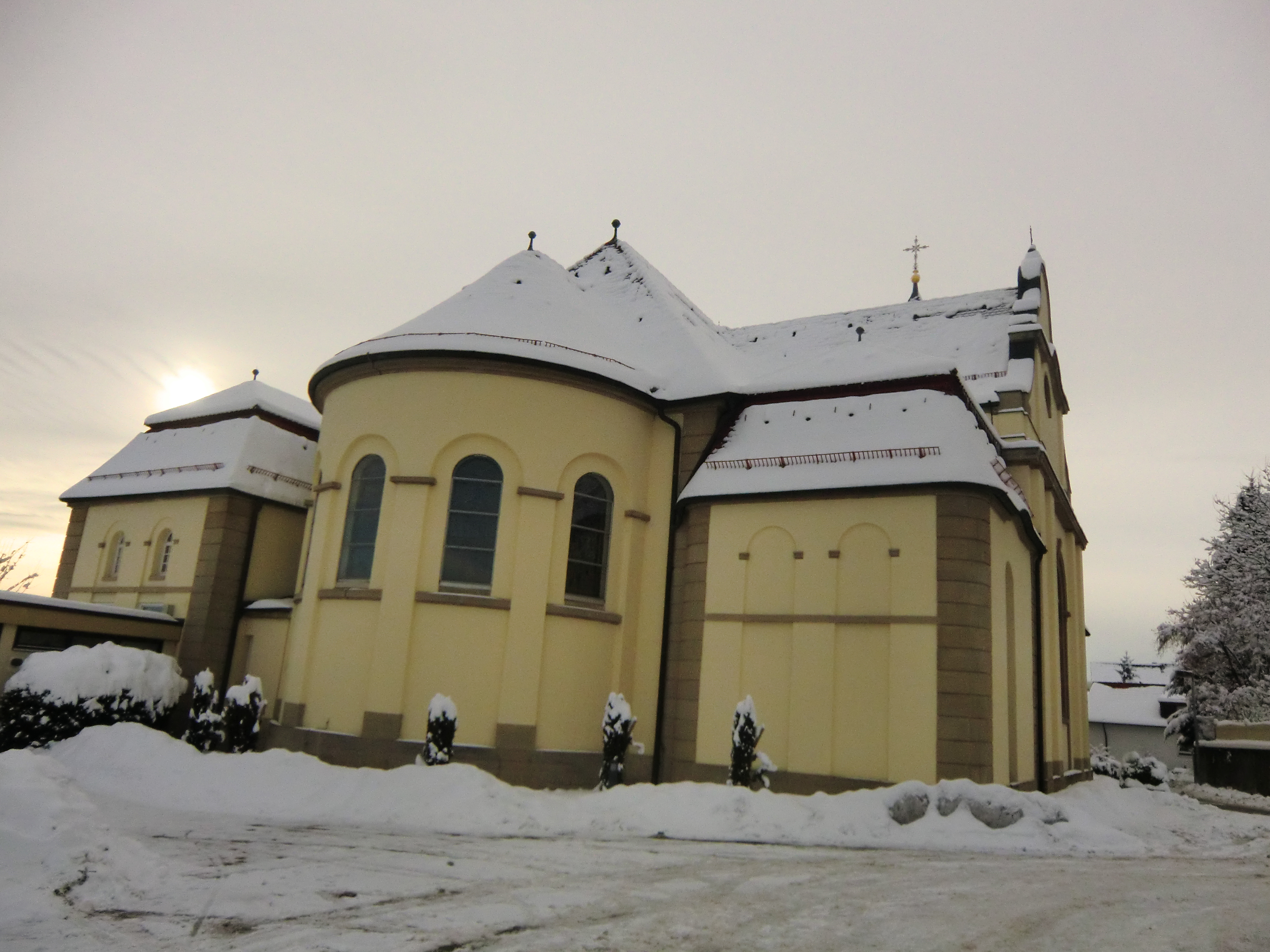
St. Cyriakus

For a long time Bettringen was mainly Roman Catholic. Since the migrations after World War II also Protestant people came to Bettringen. Today over 5000 catholic people live in Bettringen in the St. Cyriakus parish. There are three Catholic churches and a chapel:

- St. Cyriakus church, main church
- St. Ottilia church, oldest church
- Auferstehung-Christi-Church (Resurrection of Christ church)
- Felix chapel

Catholic services are held at least once a day from Tuesday to Sunday. All catholic churches have their own pipe organ. A highlight of the ecumene is the annual ecumene service, which is every Pentecost in one of the both parishes.

=== The Organ of the St. Cyriakus church ===
The pipes, stops and rows:

I Hauptwerk C–g^{3}
Helltrompete	8′
Mixtur V-VI	2′
Octave	4′
Principal	8′
Pommer	16'
Rohrflöte	8′
Gemshorn	4′
Nasatquinte	2^{2}/_{3}′
Blockflöte	2’
Tremulant

II Schwellwerk C–g^{3}
Dulcian	16′
Scharffzimbel IV	^{2}/_{3}′
Italienisch Principal	4′
Rohrflöte	8′
Quintade	8′
Schwegel	2′
Terz	1^{3}/_{5}′
Sifflöte	1^{1}/_{3}′
Tremulant

III Rückpositiv C–g^{3}
Largiot	1^{1}/_{3}′ + 1'
Kleingedackt	4′
Gedackt	8′
Principal	4′
Oktave	2′
Scharff III	1′
Oboe	8′
Tremulant

Pedal C–f^{1}
Tromba	8′
Posaune	16′
Hintersatz IV	^{2}/_{3}′
Choralbass	4′ + 2'
Oktavbass	8′
Subbass	16′
Zartbass	16′
Spitzgambe	8′

== Culture ==
Bettringen has a rich cultural life, with many clubs. There are a broad range of clubs starting with the sports club over the music club, many church-related clubs, until specific clubs. The clubs organize a lot of events throughout the year, e.g. the Corpus Christi parish festival, which is a church festival in collaboration with the German Red Cross, the music chapel, and many more.

== Education ==
Bettringen has many elementary and different kinds of high schools and a School of education (Paedagogische Hochschule).

Bettringen has a high level high school the so-called Scheffold Gymnasium after the former mayor of Schwaebisch Gmuend; a Realschule the Adalbert-Stifter Realschule, which is named after Adalbert Stifter; an elementary and Hauptschule the so-called Uhlandschule after Ludwig Uhland and the Freie Waldorf Schule (Free Waldorf School).

The Gymnasium is part of the community of Gmünder Gymnasien (community of high schools in Schwäbisch Gmünd).

== Institutions ==
=== Stiftung Haus Lindenhof ===
The Stiftung Haus Lindenhof (House Lindenhof Foundation) is a Catholic institution for disabled and old people.

=== Open-air pool ===
The Freibad Bettringen (open-air pool of Bettringen) is a pool with swimmers and non-swimmers zone.

=== Oderstraße 8 ===
The Oderstraße 8 (Oder street) is a youth center, which is hosted by the Catholic and Protestant parishes in Bettringen.
