= Axel Gotthard =

German historian

- Born: 21 April 1959 (age 67); Schwäbisch Gmünd

Academic background
- Education: University of Würzburg; University of Tübingen

Academic work
- Discipline: history
- Institutions: University of Erlangen-Nuremberg
- Main interests: Thirty Years' War; Holy Roman Empire
- Notable works: Der Augsburger Religionsfrieden

Axel Gotthard (born 21 April 1959) is a German historian of the modern age and university teacher.

Gotthard was born in Schwäbisch Gmünd. He studied at the University of Würzburg and the University of Tübingen. He works at the University of Erlangen-Nuremberg as university teacher.
