= Fritz Holzhäuer =

German Wehrmacht officer (1902–1982)

Friedrich-Wilhelm Holzhäuer
- Born: 8 July 1902; Schwäbisch Gmünd, German Empire
- Died: 14 December 1982 (aged 80); Kassel, West Germany
- Military career
- Allegiance: Nazi Germany
- Branch: Army (Wehrmacht)
- Rank: Generalmajor
- Conflicts: World War II
- Awards: Knight's Cross of the Iron Cross

Friedrich-Wilhelm "Fritz" Holzhäuer (8 July 1902 – 14 December 1982) was a German Nazi general in the Wehrmacht during World War II. He was a recipient of the Knight's Cross of the Iron Cross.

== Awards and decorations ==
- Knight's Cross of the Iron Cross on 6 August 1941 as Major and commander of the III./Panzer-Regiment 29
