= Stuttgart (region) =

Coordinates: 49°00′N 9°40′E

- Regierungsbezirk
- Map of Baden-Württemberg highlighting Stuttgart
- Country: Germany
- State: Baden-Württemberg
- Region seat: Stuttgart

Government
  - District President: Susanne Bay (Greens)

Area
  - Total: 10,155.76 km^{2} (3,921.16 sq mi)

Population (31 December 2025)
  - Total: 4,158,961
  - Density: 409.5175/km^{2} (1,060.645/sq mi)

GDP
  - Total: €285.396 billion (2024)
  - Per capita: €68,342 (2024)
- Website: https://rp.baden-wuerttemberg.de/rps/Seiten/default.aspx

Stuttgart is one of the four administrative districts (Regierungsbezirke) of Baden-Württemberg, Germany, located in the north-east of the state of Baden-Württemberg, in the southwestern part of Germany. It is sub-divided into the three regions: Heilbronn-Franken, Ostwürttemberg and Stuttgart.

Kreise
(districts)
1. Böblingen
2. Esslingen
3. Göppingen
4. Heidenheim
5. Heilbronn
6. Hohenlohe
7. Ludwigsburg
8. Main-Tauber
9. Ostalbkreis
10. Rems-Murr
11. Schwäbisch Hall
Kreisfreie Städte
(district-free towns)
1. Heilbronn
2. Stuttgart

The districts of Böblingen, Esslingen, Ludwigsburg, Rems-Murr and Göppingen form with the city of Stuttgart the Verband Region Stuttgart with a directly elected regional assembly (Regionalversammlung).

== Economy ==
The Gross domestic product (GDP) of the region was 213.4 billion € in 2018, accounting for 6.4% of German economic output. GDP per capita adjusted for purchasing power was 47,400 € or 157% of the EU27 average in the same year. The GDP per employee was 123% of the EU average. This makes it one of the wealthiest regions in Germany and Europe.

The region is served by Stuttgart Airport, it is the sixth busiest airport in Germany with 91 million passengers having passed through its doors in 2024.
