= Festival Europäische Kirchenmusik =

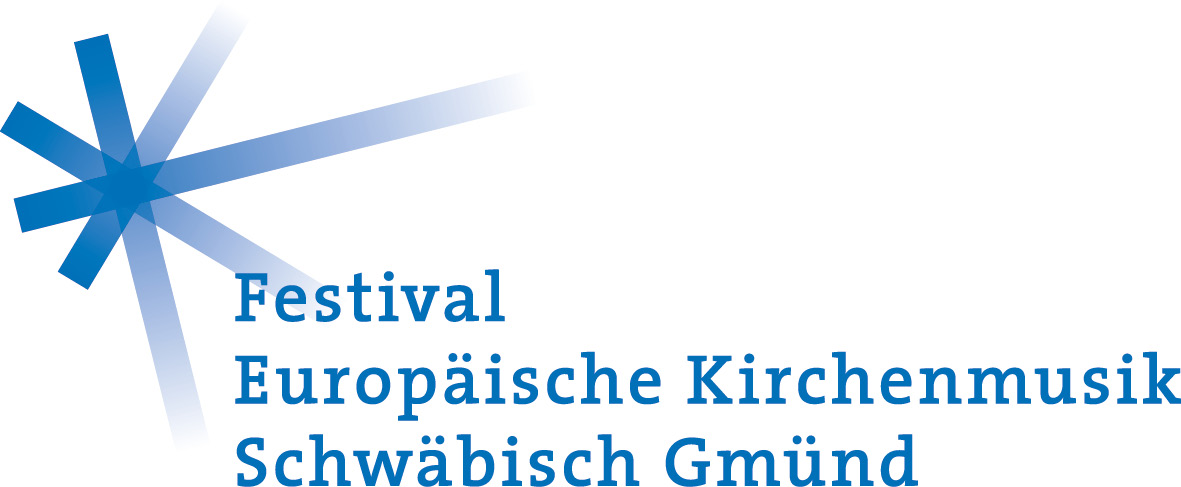
Logo

The Festival Europäische Kirchenmusik (European Church Music Festival) (in short: EKM) is a German music festival held annually in July and August since 1989 in Schwäbisch Gmünd. The festival is attended by over 15,000 visitors each season. The programs include a musical repertoire from the Middle Ages to the present. In addition to international ensembles it showcases young talents. There are competitions for composition of sacred music and organ improvisation, commissioned works and world premieres. The festival has also given the Preis der Europäischen Kirchenmusik since 1999.
