= Holy Cross Church (Schwäbisch Gmünd) =

Catholic church in Schwäbisch Gmünd, Germany

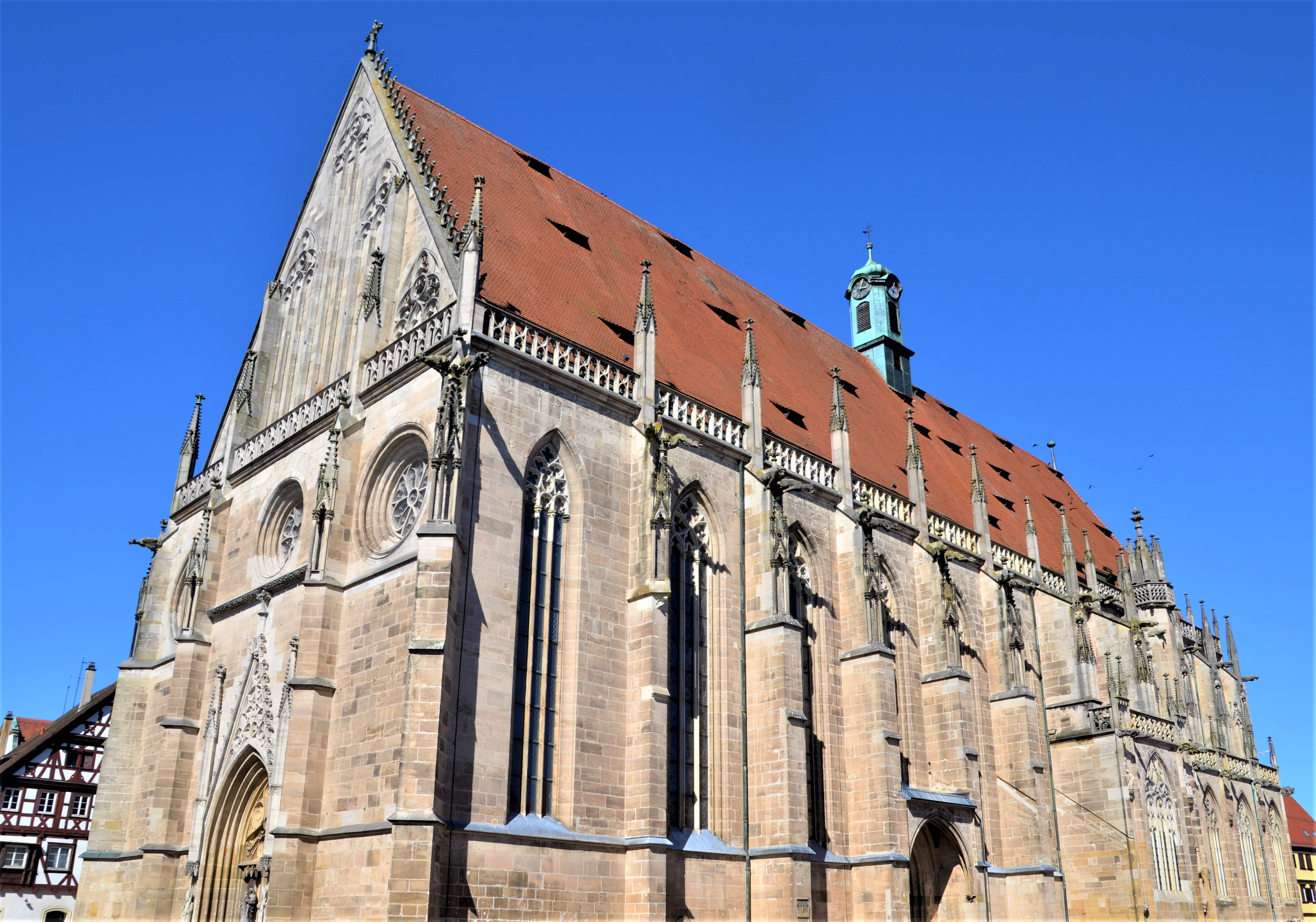
The church in 2020

Holy Cross Church (German: Heilig-Kreuz-Münster), formerly known as the Collegiate Church of Our Lady (German: Stifts- und Kollegiatkirche zu Unserer Lieben Frau) and commonly referred to as the Gmünder Münster, is a Catholic church in Schwäbisch Gmünd, Germany. It was built by the architect Heinrich Parler.
