= Sondergotik =

Style of Late Gothic architecture

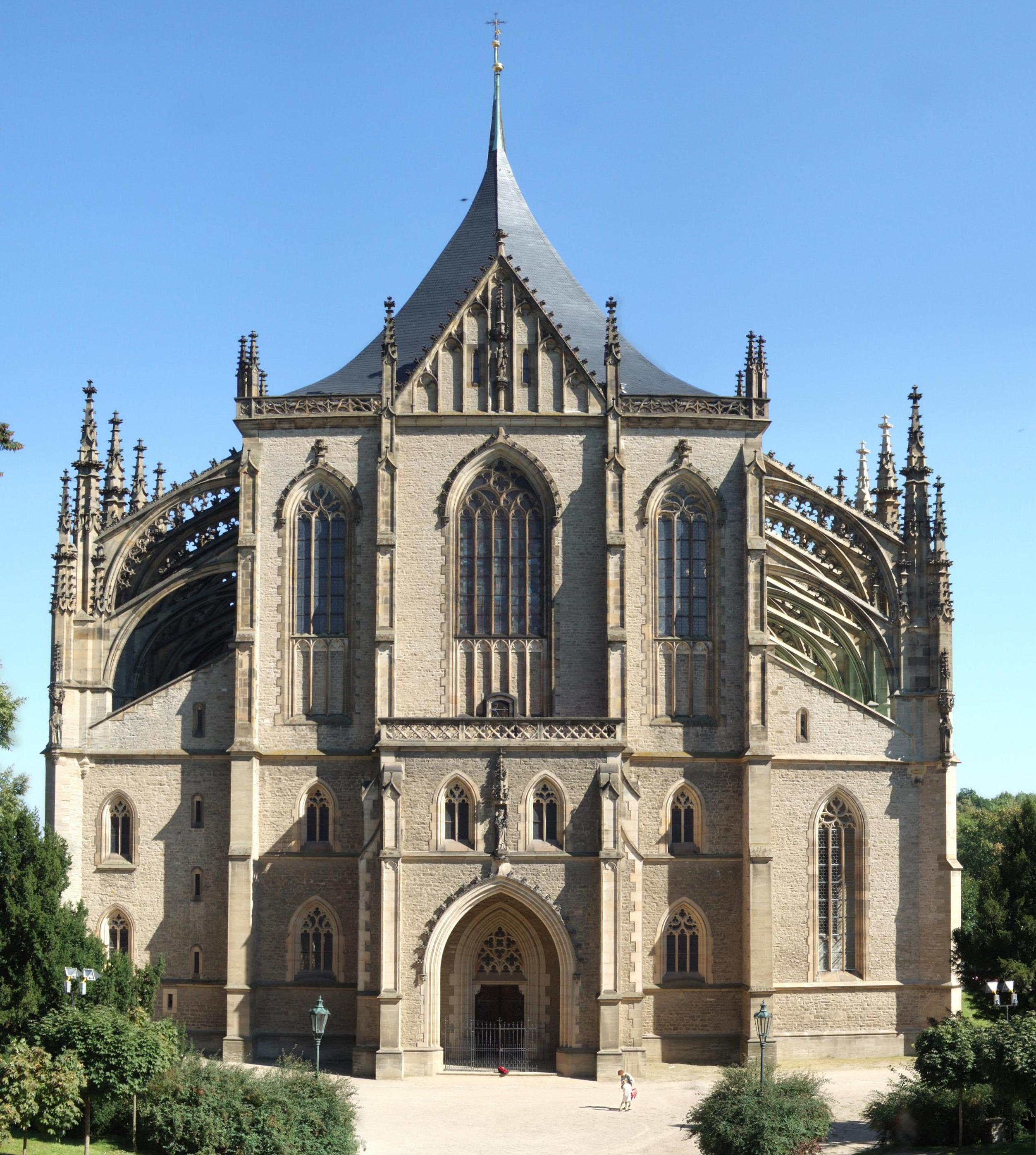
Saint Barbara Church in Kutná Hora, Czech Republic

Sondergotik (German: [ˈzɔndɐˌɡoːtɪk]; Special Gothic) is the style of Late Gothic architecture prevalent in Austria, Bavaria, Swabia, Saxony, Alsace, Rhineland, Switzerland, Bohemia and Silesia between 1350 and 1550. The term was invented by art historian Kurt Gerstenberg in his 1913 work Deutsche Sondergotik, in which he argued that the Late Gothic had a special expression in Germany (especially the South and the Rhineland) marked by the use of the hall church or Hallenkirche. At the same time the style forms part of the International Gothic style in its origins.

The style was contemporaneous with several unique local styles of Gothic: the Flamboyant in France and Belgium, the Isabelline in Spain, the Manueline in Portugal and the Perpendicular in England. Like these, the Sondergotik showed an attention to detail both within and without. In many Sondergotik buildings, fluidity and a wood-like quality were stressed in carving and decoration, particularly on vaults. The rib patterns of Sondergotik vaults are elaborate and often curved (in plan), sometimes using broken and flying ribs (features extremely rare in other regions). Outside, the buildings tended towards mass buttressing.

Among the most famous Sondergotik constructions is Saint Barbara Church in Kutná Hora (modern Czech Republic), built by the Parlers, a family of masons.

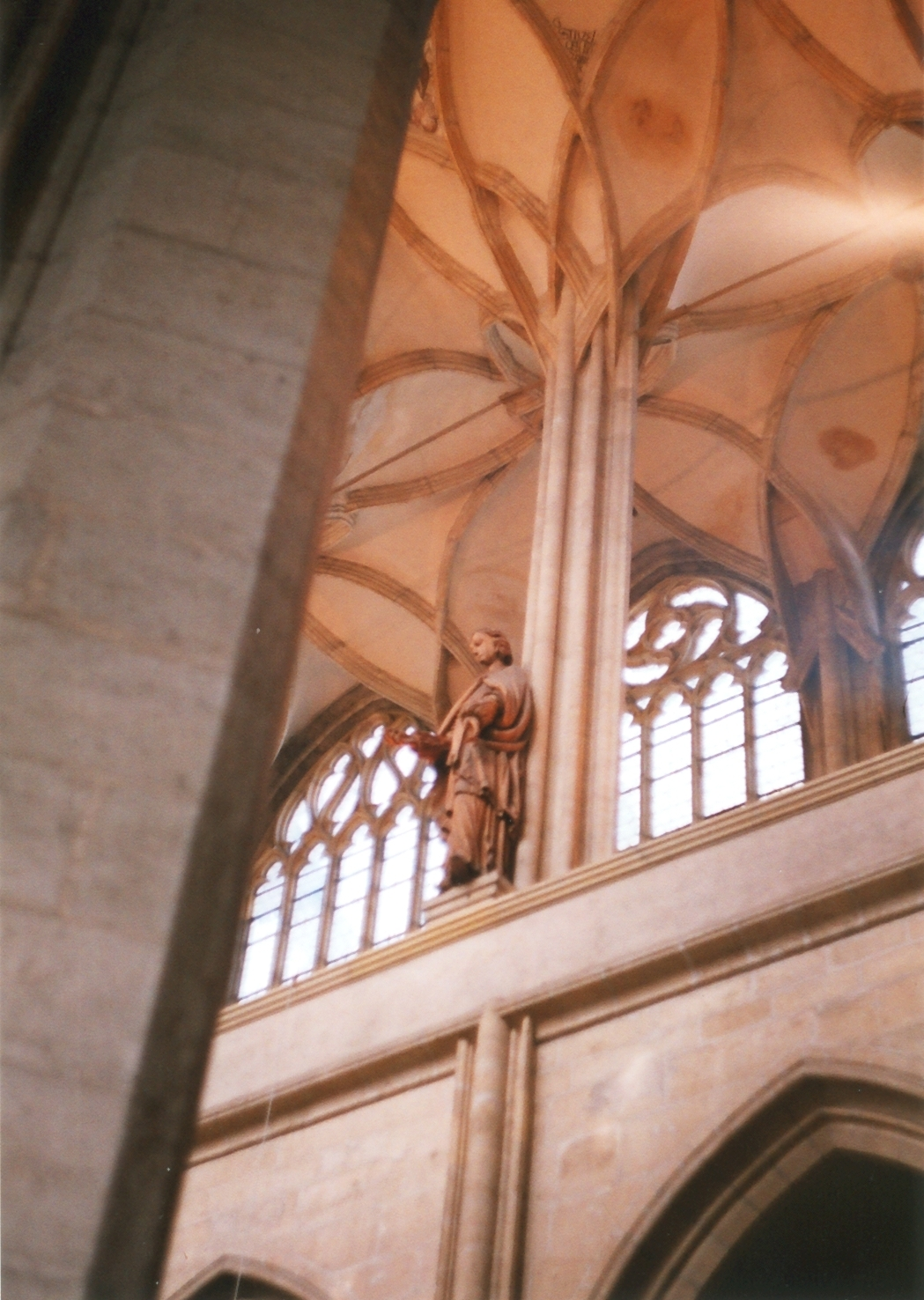
Curved, broken ribs at Kutná Hora.

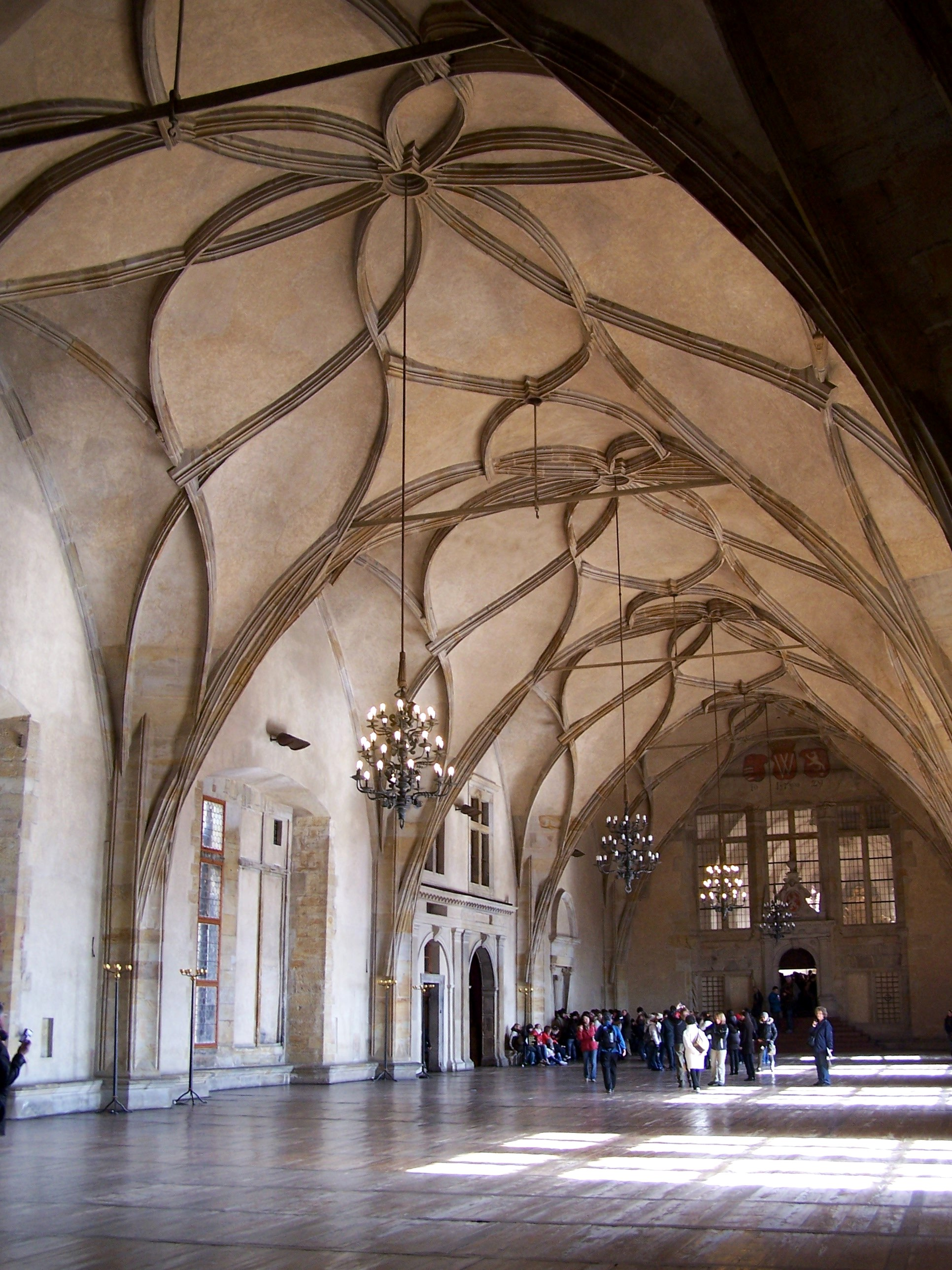
Curved, broken ribs in Vladislav Hall, Prague.

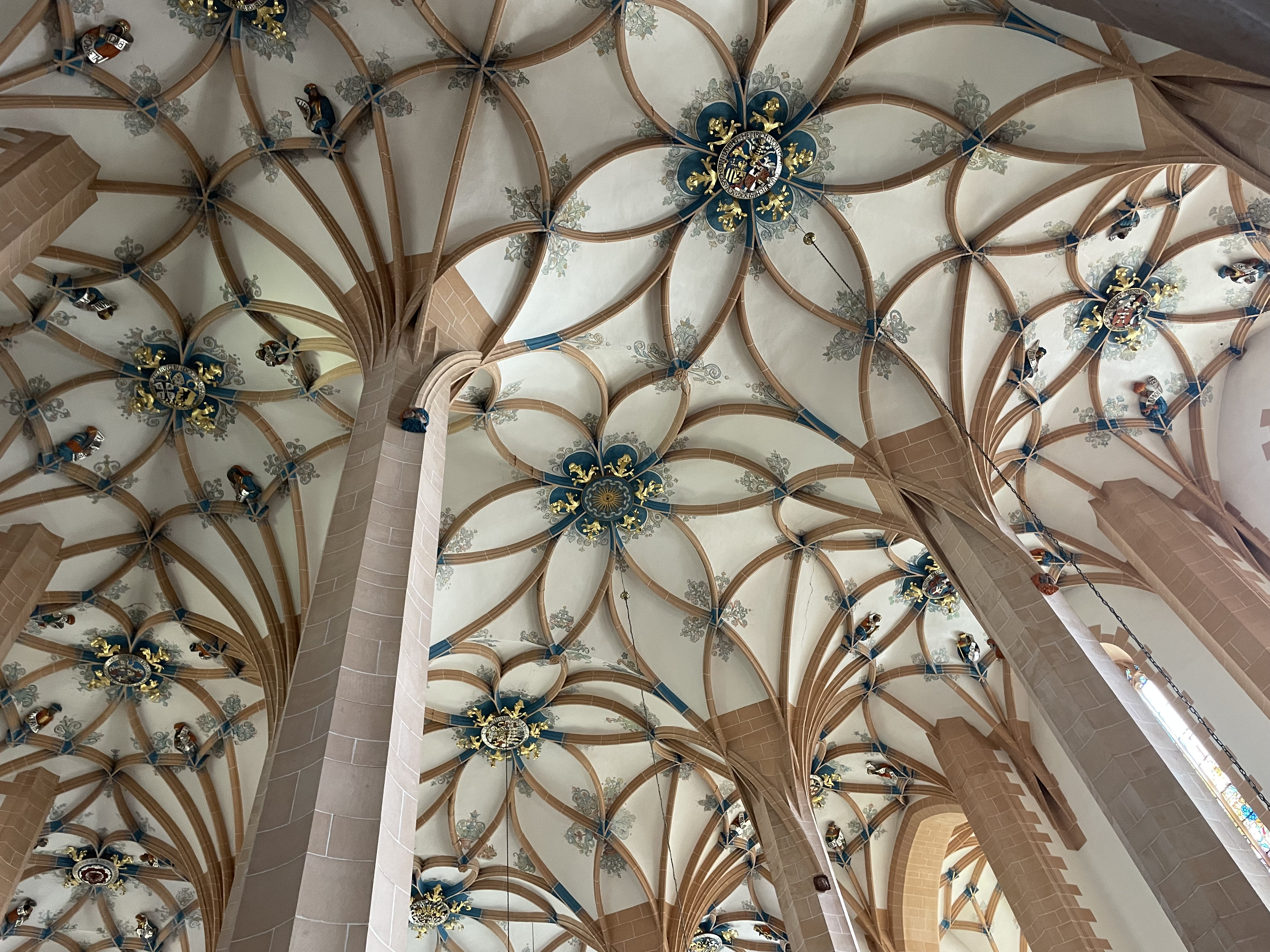
Reticulated vault of St. Annenkirche, Annaberg-Buchholz

== Sources ==
- The Grove Dictionary of Art: Sondergotik.
- Cole, Emily, ed. (2002). The Grammar of Architecture. Bullfinch Press.
