= Jacob Haylmann =

German architect

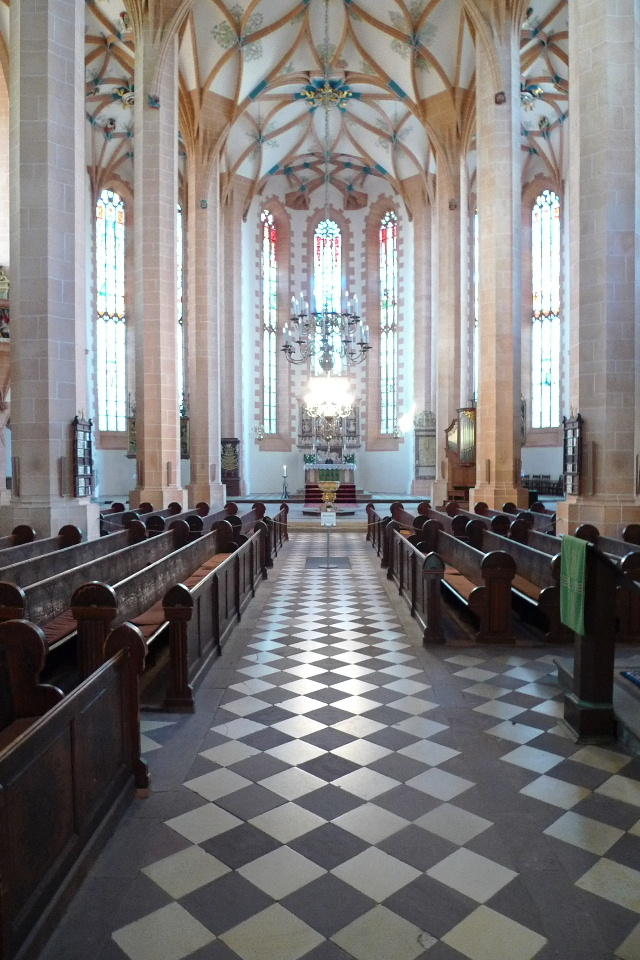
Nave of St. Anne's Church, Annaberg-Buchholz, completed 1525

Jacob Haylmann or Jacob von Schweinfurt (1475–1526) was a German architect. His greatest masterpiece is St. Anne's Church, Annaberg-Buchholz. Haylmann was one of the pioneers of early Renaissance architecture in the Electorate of Saxony.

== Life ==
Jacob Haylmann was born in Schweinfurt in 1475 where he learned the stonemason profession. During this period he contributed to the construction of the town hall in Schweinfurt. In 1500 he began work under architect Benedikt Rejt during the construction of massive Vladislav Hall at Prague Castle, Hradschin, Prague. In 1515 Haylmann was appointed construction manager (German: Baumeister) of St. Anne's Church, Annaberg-Buchholz. St. Anne's is the most advanced representative of a range of religious buildings that emerged in the late 15th and early 16th centuries, especially in upper Saxony. The church was finished in 1525 in an architectural style on the boundary between the Late Gothic and Early Renaissance. Haylmann used the same architectural elements from St Anne's in the construction of the Gewandhaus in Zwickau between 1522 and 1525. He died in Annaberg in 1526.

== Gallery ==
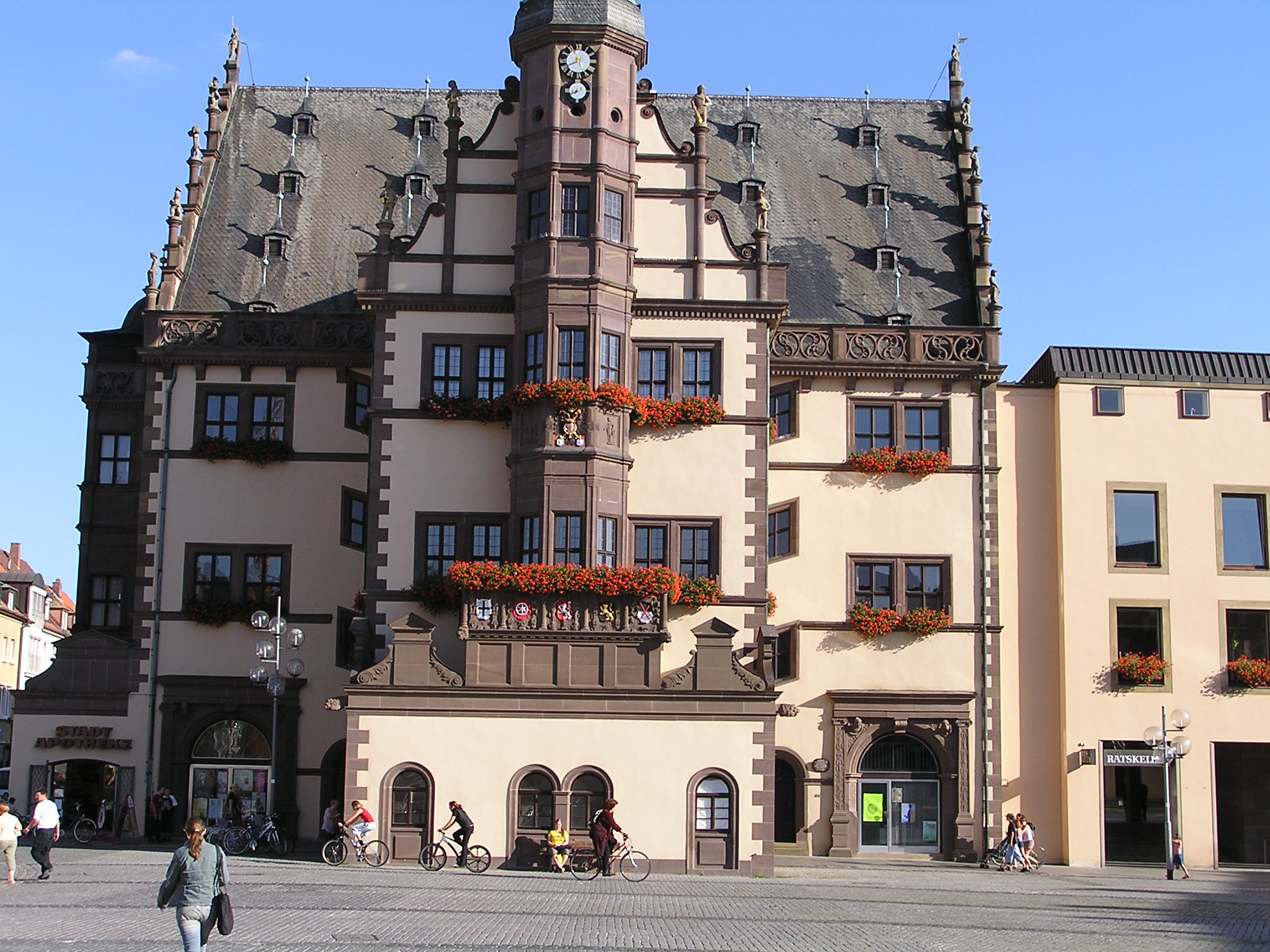
Town hall, Schweinfurt

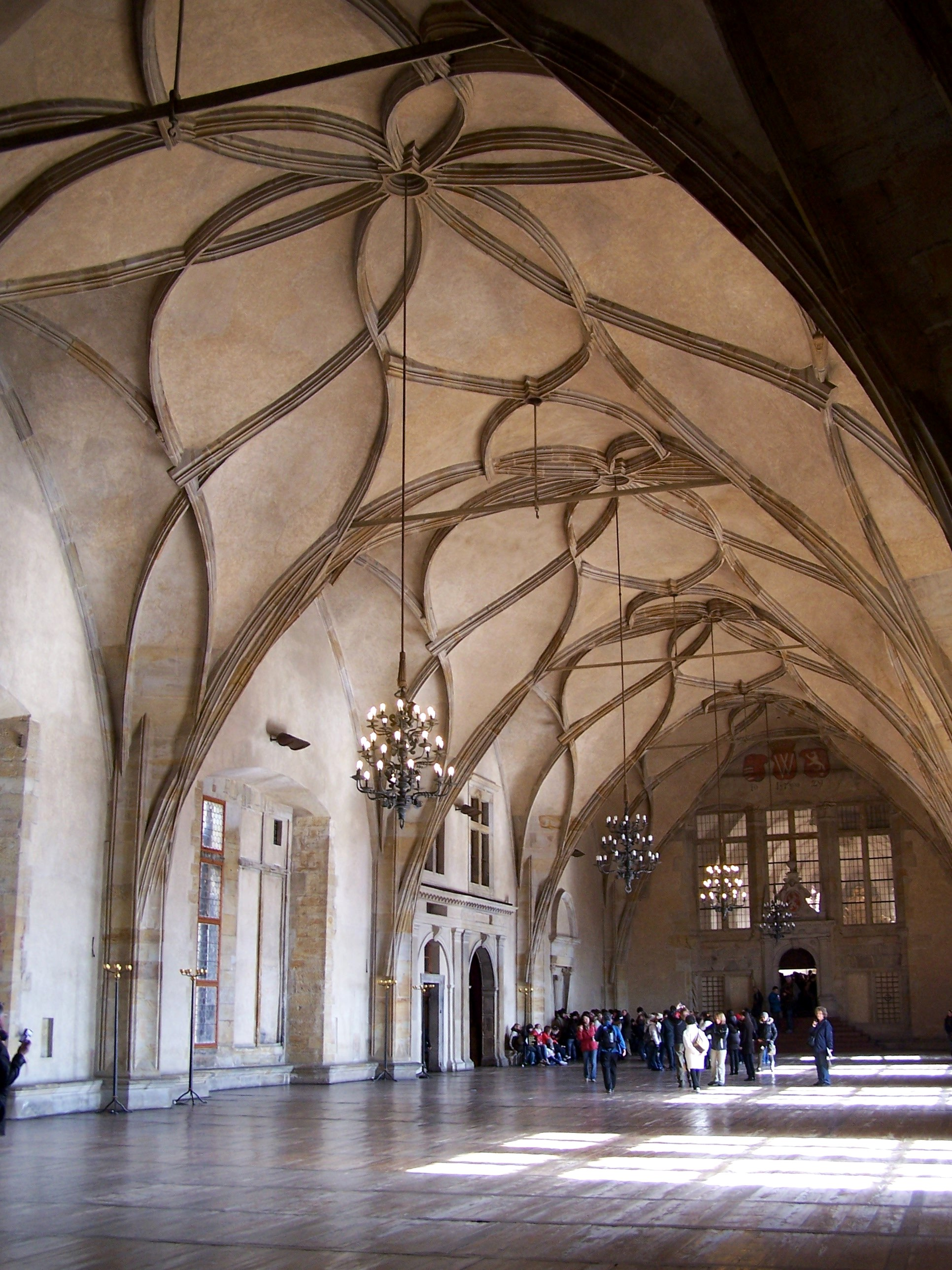
Vladislav Hall, Prague Castle

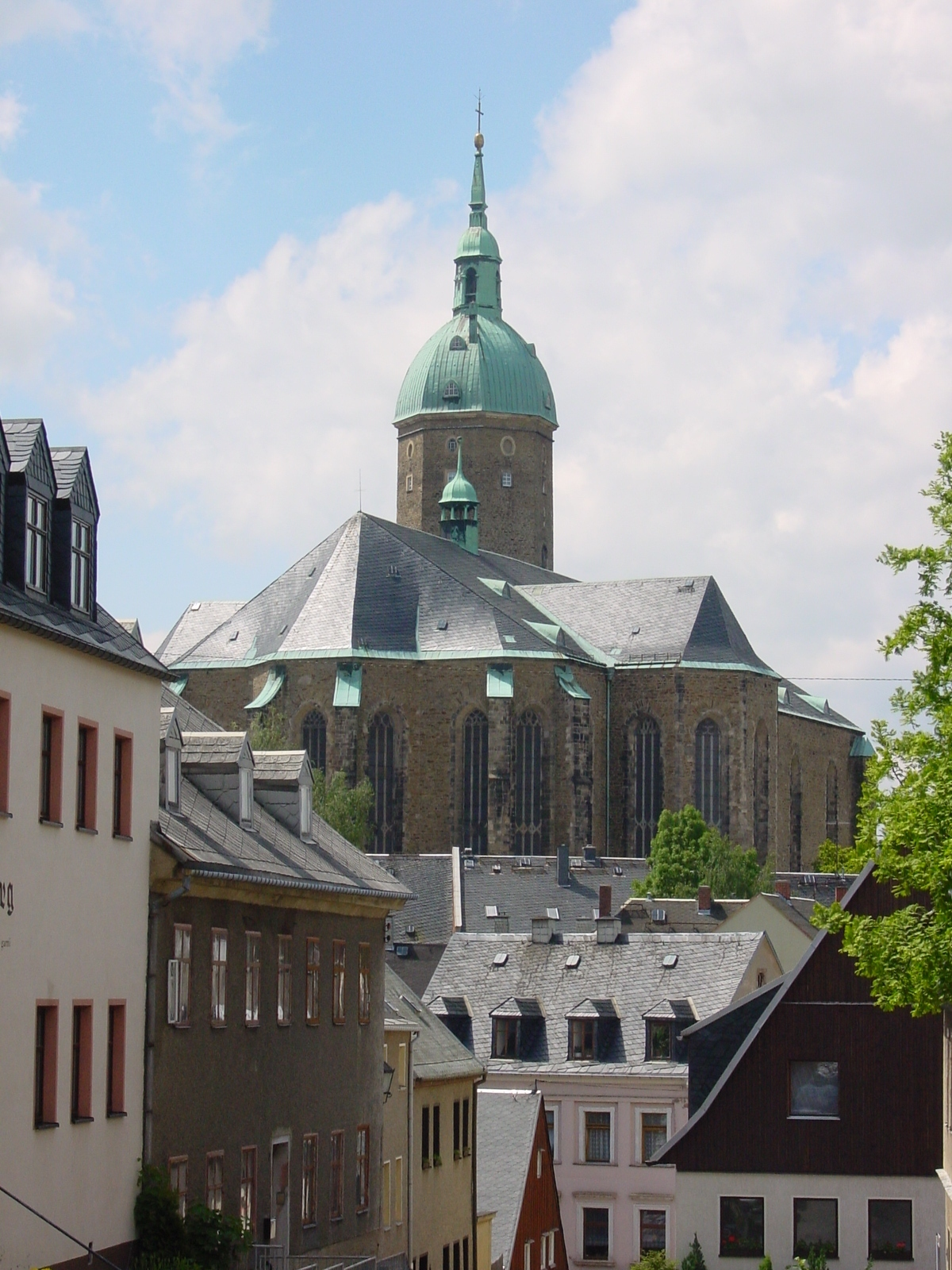
St. Anne's Church, Annaberg-Buchholz

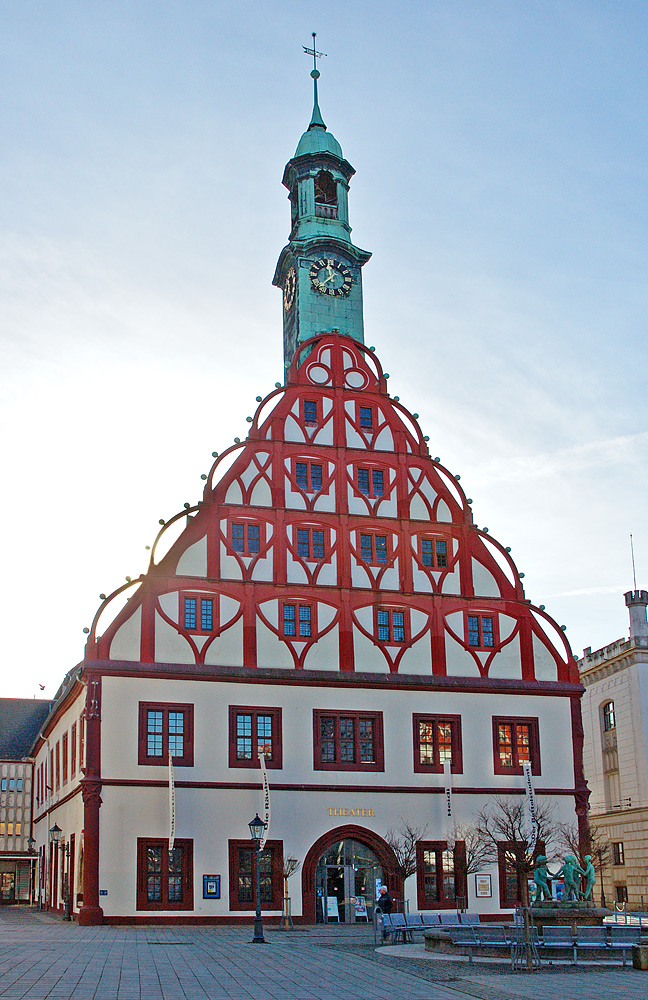
Gewandhaus, Zwickau
