= Rabí =

- Town
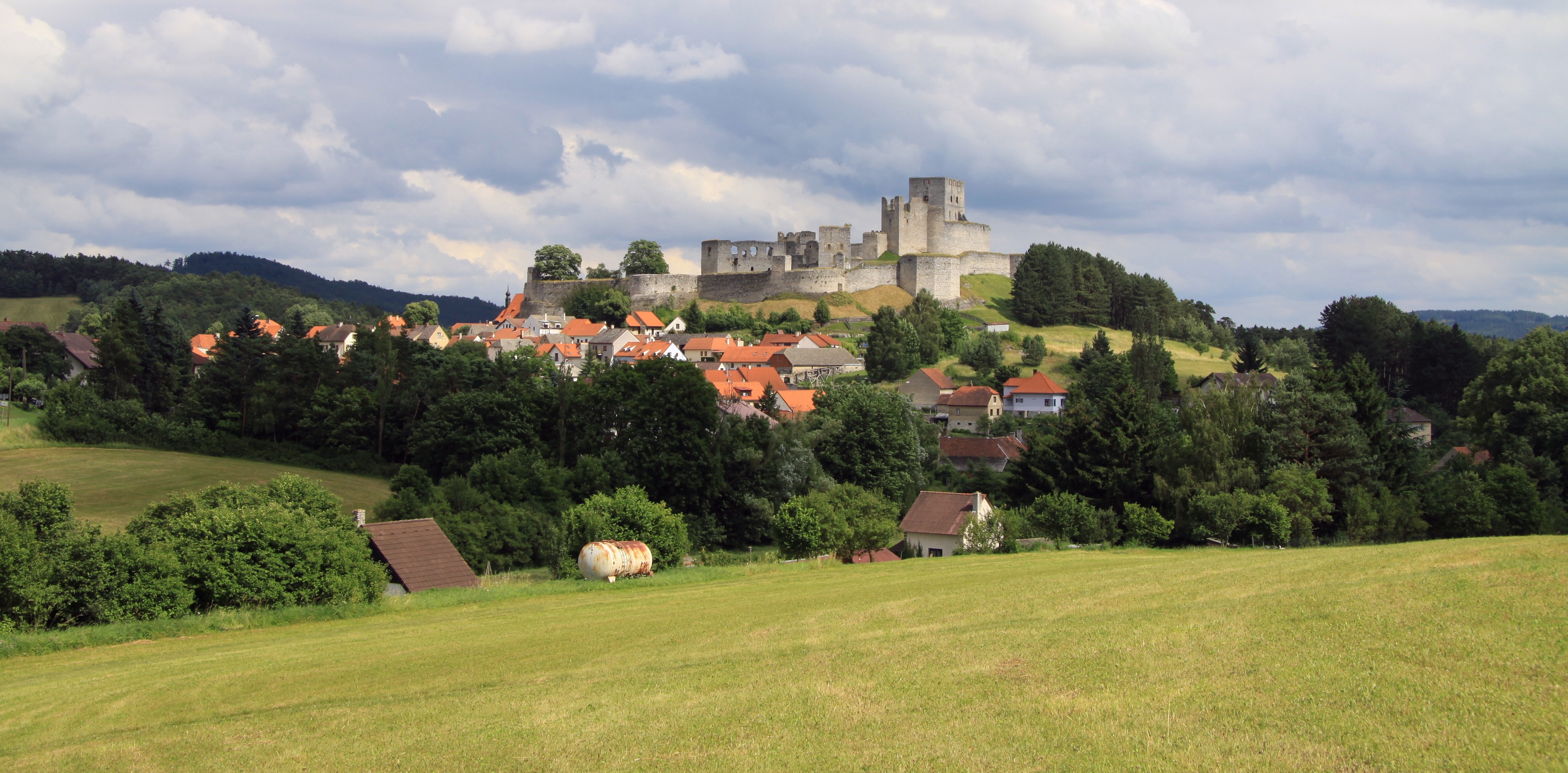
- Rabí with the Rabí Castle

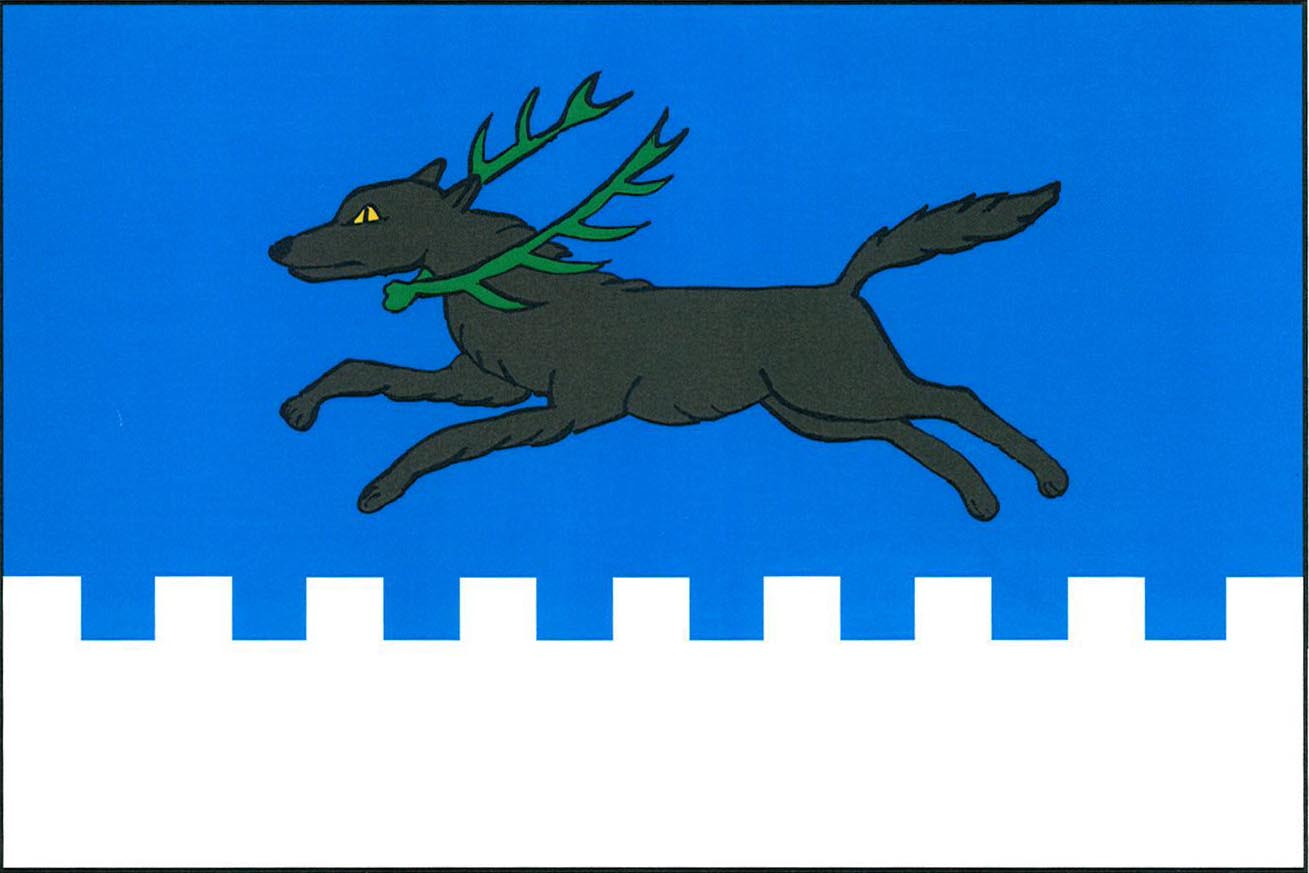
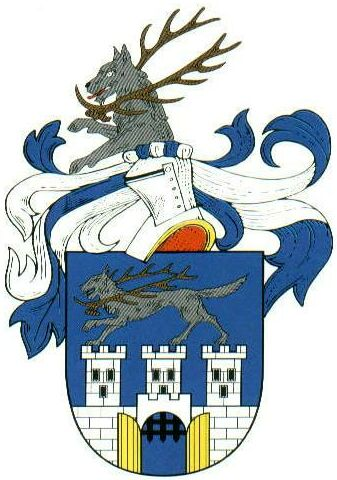
- Flag Coat of arms

- Location in the Czech Republic
- Coordinates: 49°17′2″N 13°37′28″E
- Country: Czech Republic
- Region: Plzeň
- District: Klatovy
- First mentioned: 1373

Government
  - Mayor: Miroslav Kraucher

Area
  - Total: 14.32 km^{2} (5.53 sq mi)
- Elevation: 478 m (1,568 ft)

Population (2026-01-01)
  - Total: 504
  - Density: 35.2/km^{2} (91.2/sq mi)
- Time zone: UTC+1 (CET)
  - Summer (DST): UTC+2 (CEST)
- Postal code: 342 01
- Website: www.mestorabi.cz

Rabí (Czech pronunciation: [ˈrabiː]; German: Rabi) is a town in Klatovy District in the Plzeň Region of the Czech Republic. It has about 500 inhabitants. The town is located on the Otava River in the Bohemian Forest Foothills.

Rabí is known for ruins of the Rabí Castle, one of the largest castles in the country, which is protected as a national cultural monument. The historic town centre is well preserved and is protected as an urban monument zone.

== Administrative division ==
Rabí consists of three municipal parts (in brackets population according to the 2021 census):

- Rabí (336)
- Bojanovice (84)
- Čepice (86)

== Etymology ==
The name Rabí is derived from the personal name Ráb, meaning "Ráb's place". Alternatively, the form Rábí was also used.

== Geography ==
Rabí is located about 26 kilometres (16 mi) southeast of Klatovy and 52 km (32 mi) south of Plzeň. It lies in the Bohemian Forest Foothills. The highest point is the hill Čepičná at 671 m (2,201 ft) above sea level. The town is situated on the left bank of the Otava River.

== History ==
The Rabí Castle was founded probably between 1124 and 1173. The first written mention of Rabí is from 1373, when the so-called Horní město ('upper town') and Dolní město ('lower town') were mentioned. The first mention of the owners of Rabí is from 1380, when it was the property of the nobleman Půta Švihovský of Rýzmberk. In 1420, the castle surrendered to the large army of Jan Žižka, then the castle was looted and burned. The castle was then reconstructed, but in 1421 it was again conquered by the Hussites and Jan Žižka lost his second eye here.

== Demographics ==
Historical population

Year	Pop.	±%
1869	1,152	—
1880	1,208	+4.9%
1890	1,116	−7.6%
1900	1,131	+1.3%
1910	1,153	+1.9%

Year	Pop.	±%
1921	1,121	−2.8%
1930	1,043	−7.0%
1950	857	−17.8%
1961	815	−4.9%
1970	685	−16.0%

Year	Pop.	±%
1980	606	−11.5%
1991	538	−11.2%
2001	479	−11.0%
2011	479	+0.0%
2021	506	+5.6%

Source: Censuses

== Transport ==
The railway line Klatovy–Horažďovice runs through the territory of Rabí, but there is no train station. The town is served by the station in neighbouring Žichovice.

== Sights ==
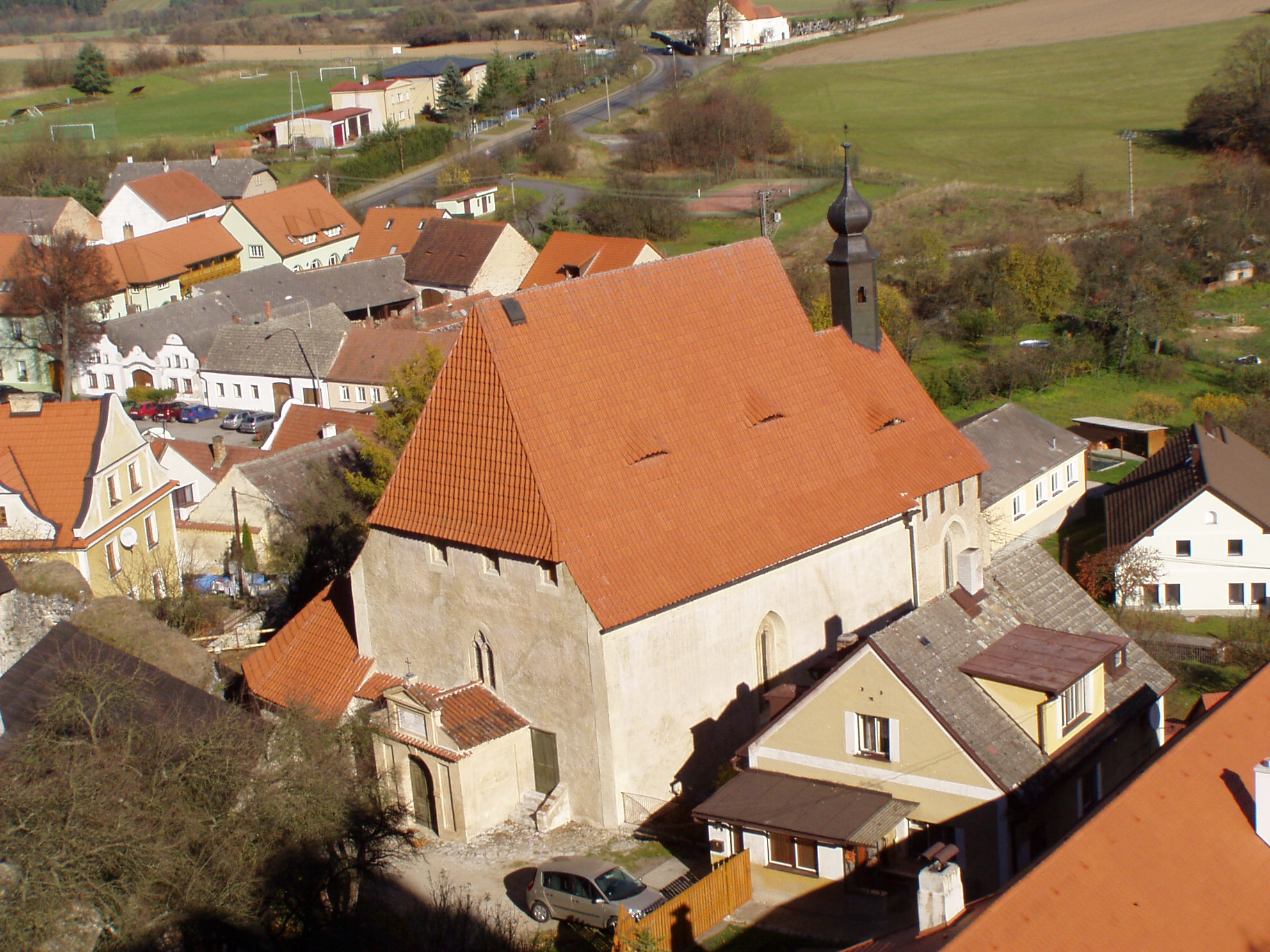
Church of the Holy Trinity

The main landmark of Rabí is the Rabí Castle, one of the largest castles in the country. The Gothic castle was rebuilt and extended at the end of the 15th century, possibly by Benedikt Rejt. The late Gothic fortification from the 15th century remained unfinished for economic reasons, but still, it is one of the most advanced fortifications in Central Europe. The castle complex is protected as a national cultural monument. Today it is owned by the state and is open to the public.

The Church of the Holy Trinity is part of the castle complex. It is a late Gothic building that was finished in 1498 as a castle chapel. Later it became a parish church.
