= Gerstenberg (surname) =

Gerstenberg is a German surname. Notable people with the surname include:

- Alfred Gerstenberg (1893–1959), German Luftwaffe general
- Alice Gerstenberg (1885–1972), American playwright, actress and activist
- Detlef Gerstenberg (1957–1993), East German hammer thrower
- Heinrich Wilhelm von Gerstenberg (1737–1823), German poet and critic
- Kurt Gerstenberg (1886–1968), German art historian
- Jamie Gerstenberg (born 2002), German association football player
- Otto Gerstenberg (1848-1935), German businessman, mathematician and art collector
