= St. Nicholas Church, Louny =

Church in Louny, Czech Republic

Church of St Nicholas
- The Parish Church of St Nicholas
- Kostel svatého Mikuláše
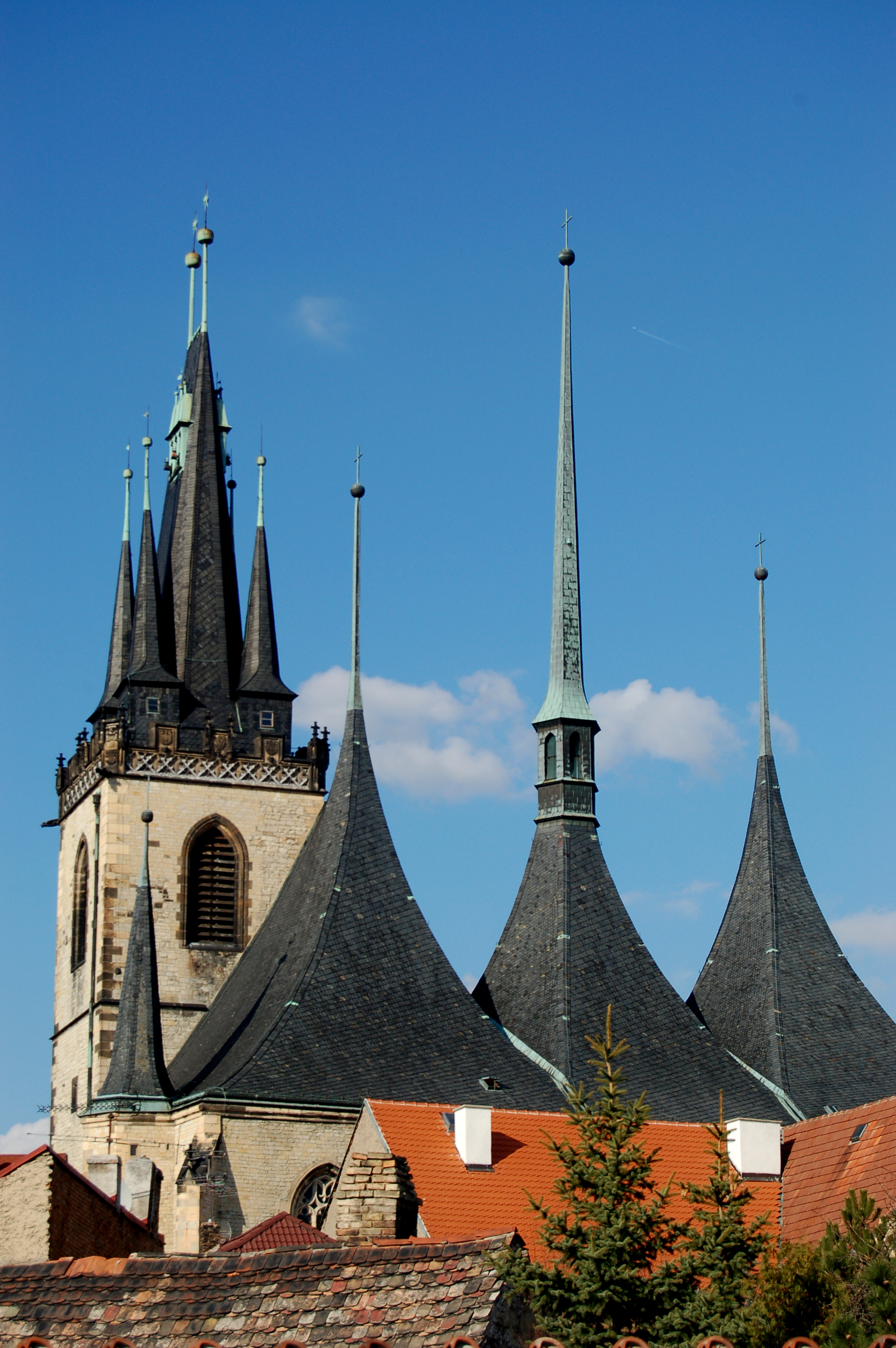

- Location in Czech Republic
- 50°21′26″N 13°47′43″E
- Location: Louny
- Country: Czech Republic
- Denomination: Roman Catholic
- Website: www.farnostlouny.com/index.php

History
- Status: Active
- Dedication: Saint Nicholas

Architecture
- Functional status: Parish church
- Architect: Benedikt Rejt
- Architectural type: Church
- Style: Gothic
- Completed: 1538

Administration
- Diocese: Litoměřice
- Parish: Louny

Clergy
- Bishop: Jan Baxant
- Rector: Werner Horák

Sound of the church bells

St. Nicholas Church in Louny (Czech: Chrám svatého Mikuláše v Lounech) is a Roman Catholic, parochial church dedicated to Saint Nicholas, located in Louny, Czech Republic.

In 1517, a fire destroyed the nave and damaged the tower of the original church. A new church was designed and rebuilt by royal architect Benedikt Rejt. After it was finished in 1538, it became one of the supreme pieces of Czech late Gothic. The temple has three naves, with external support system, round arches and pyramid-shaped turrets.

== Description ==
The interior is dominated by woodcarved main altar. The altar was made during 1701–1706 by sculptor Jeroným Kohl with his apprentice František Preiss. In the end of 19th century when the church has undergone restorations by Josef Mocker and Kamil Hilbert. During that time, the painting the altar was considered but in the end it didn't come into realisation. The altar is divided into three parts – the main one in the middle and two lateral, "optically" divided by huge screw-shaped columns – each of the which is mastered by a painting on wood in the midsection. The carvings come to the stunning details – the altar contains tens of characters of the biblical teachings, angels and baroque decor.

Two of the tall Gothic stained glass windows with religious motives were donated by local citizens and date to the restorations from the break of 19th and the 20th century; the others have decent, non-figurative content.

== Tower ==
The temple tower is 60 m tall. Sandstone was used as a building material. Inside the tower, there is a winding stairwell with approximately 180 stairs, leading to a belfry and the gallery with the view on the entire town and surrounding. In the belfry, there are two bells, each approximately 60 cm tall.

Presently, the temple goes under minor amendments, however the church services and tours are not disrupted. Tours to the tower are allowed.

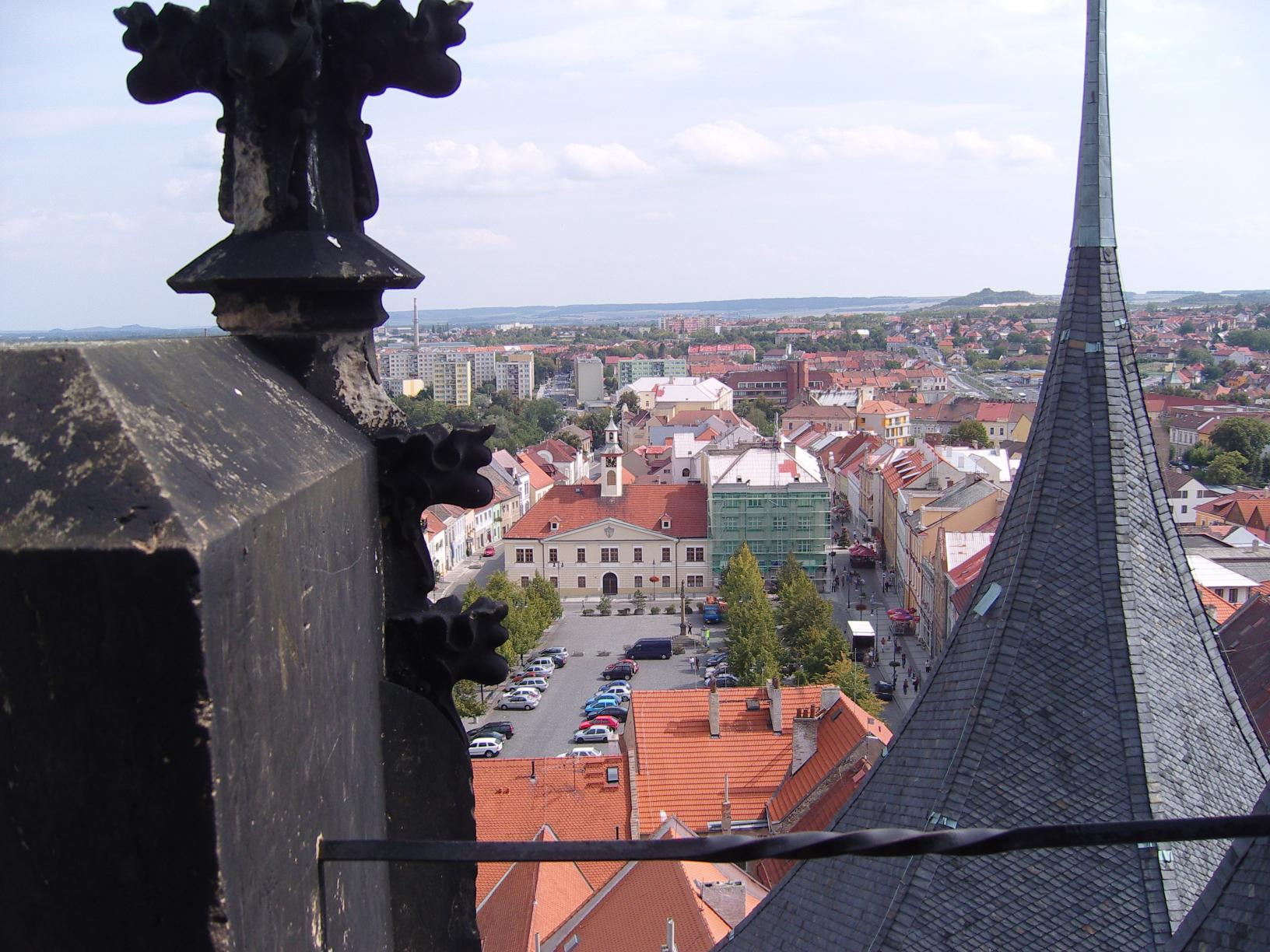

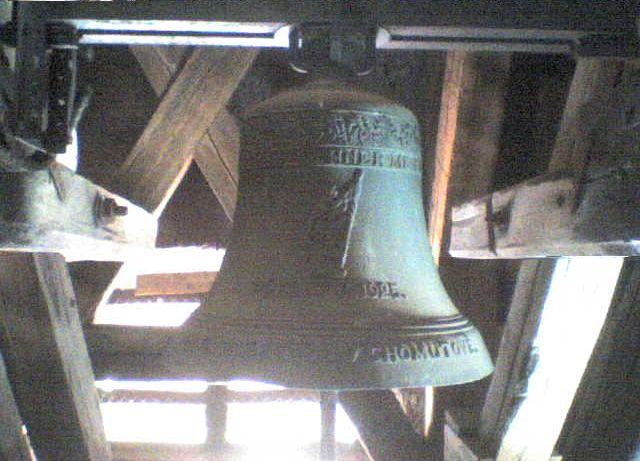

== General sources ==
- http://www.pametihodnosti.cz/pamatka/586/podrobne/louny___chram_sv_mikulase_kostel.html (Czech)
- http://farnostlouny.com/kostel.html (Czech)
