= Rabí Castle =

Rabí
- Rabí, Plzeň Region
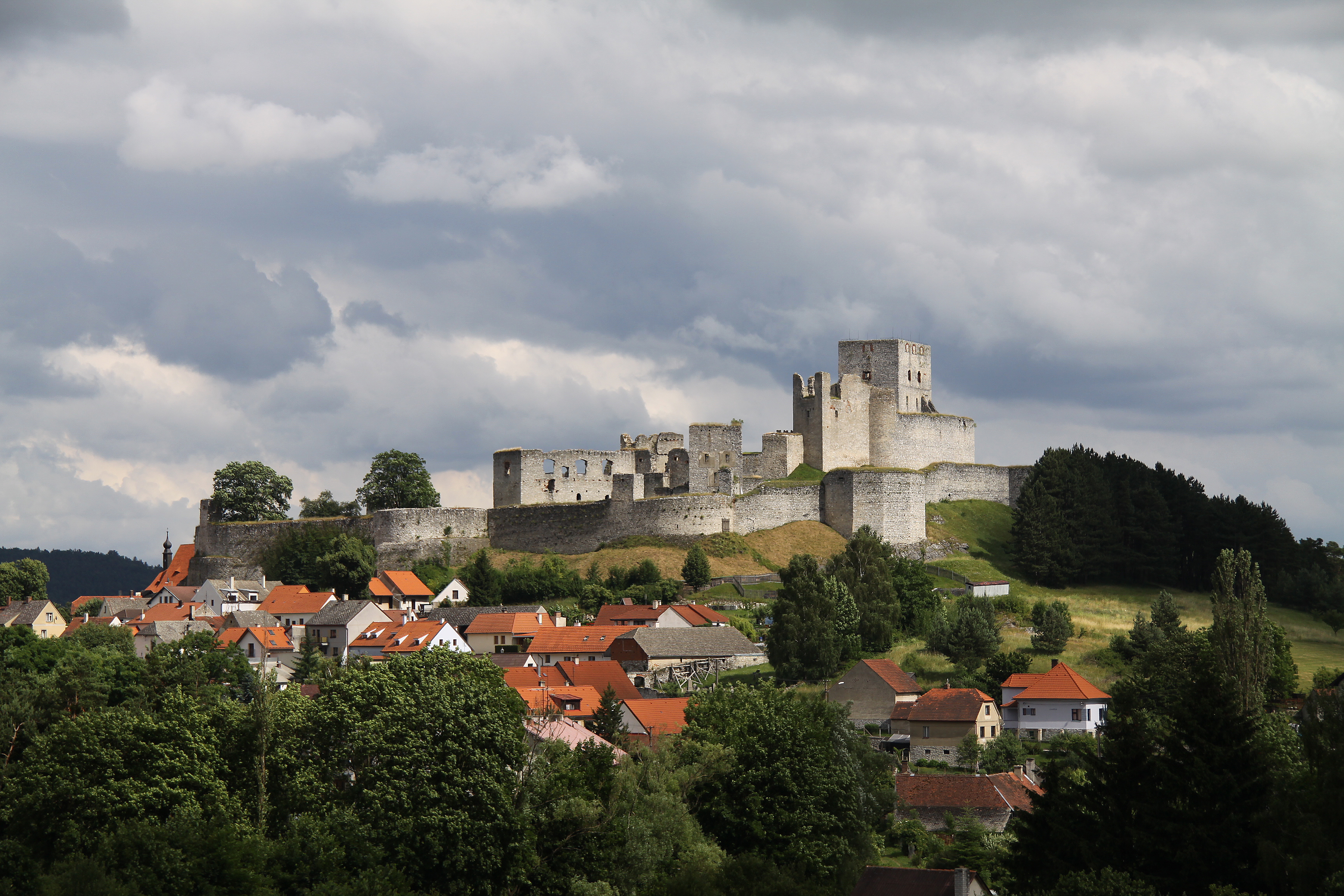
- Rabí Castle

Site information
- Type: Castle

Location
- Location in the Czech Republic
- Coordinates: 49°16′45.94″N 13°37′5.23″E

Rabí or Rábí is a ruined castle in the Plzeň Region of the Czech Republic. It is the largest castle (in terms of area) in the country.

Rabí Castle was proclaimed a national cultural monument in 1978.

== Etymology ==
The name of the castle might derive from the German word raben ("raven"), or it could be mangled Czech name vrab(č)í vrch ("sparrow's peak"). (Note: Czech scholar Michal Novák points that one possible explanation would be that the name probably stems from the German word raben, which means "raven", or it could also suggest something like "Raven's Peak". Another explanation lies in the expression Rabiri, the vernacular form of "gold-surveyors", and a third that might be a derivation from vrabec, a bird's name.)

== Location ==
Rabí is located on a prominent hill by the central course of the Otava River, in the foothills of Bohemian Forest Foothills, 130 kilometres (81 mi) southwest of Prague.

== History ==
The first mention of Rabí Castle dates from 1380, although it is not known exactly when it was founded. It is likely that the Lords of Velhartice established it after 1300 to protect trade routes along the Otava and also to inspect gold-bearing deposits in it. (Note: Novák points out a theory that suggests that the castle was commissioned by Bavarian princes when the whole Sušice region was under Bavarian rule, although earlier opposing views state that the castle was only built in the 14th century, constructed by the Lords of Velhartice who had estates nearby.) They built a strong palace, ramparts and a keep. Subsequent owners, the Švihovský of Rýzmburk family, continued the building work and built the outer ward and two square towers.

At the start of the Hussite rebellions, the Švihovský family searched for havens of supporters of the Catholic side in the district and for their treasures, at Rabí. In 1420–1421, the Hussites conquered the castle twice, and legend has it that during the second siege, an arrow shot from a crossbow hit the trunk of a pear tree and a splinter from the tree hit Jan Žižka in his only good eye. In 1479, the provincial governor Půta Švihovský of Rýzmberk became the owner of the estate and began with a thoughtful remodelling of the castle under the guidance of famous master Benedict Rejt. New living quarters and service buildings were constructed, the castle was enlarged and the fortifications heightened.

Rabí Castle was, from the very start, envisioned as a donjon-type castle. It was built in the form of three separate sections, constructed in tiers above each other. The ramparts were up to 6 metres (20 ft) wide, and had bastions, vallum fortifications and moats. However, building activity exhausted the Švihovský family's finances and the fortifications remained incomplete.

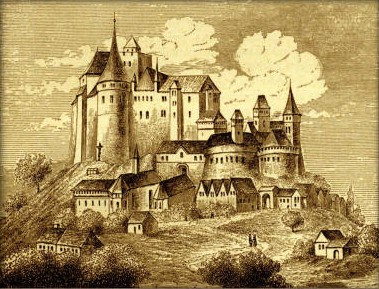
Rabí Castle in 1708

Many alchemical experiences took place during Půta's time as well; a German alchemist who failed to transform lead into gold was then imprisoned in the castle's massive prismatic tower. Půta had three nannies walled in alive for turning his wife against his brothers. His son later sold the estate in 1549, but the new owners did not invest in the castle. Instead, they made use exclusively of the existing original buildings. The following owners, the House of Chanov, from Dlouhá Ves, bought the castle in 1570.

The slowly deteriorating complex was completely devastated during the Thirty Years' War when Mansfeld's soldiers went on the rampage. Emperor Ferdinand III ordered that the castle should have been destroyed after 1650. In the end it was saved, but on the condition that it was not to be repaired. In time it became a source of building material for local peasants.

The last owners, the Lamberk family (from 1708) donated the castle to the Horažďovice Society for the Preservation of Artistic, Cultural and Natural Monuments for a symbolic price of 1 CSK in 1920, and after 1945 it was taken by the Czechoslovak State.

== See also ==
- Horažďovice
- Radyně Castle
