= Benedikt Rejt =

Czech architect

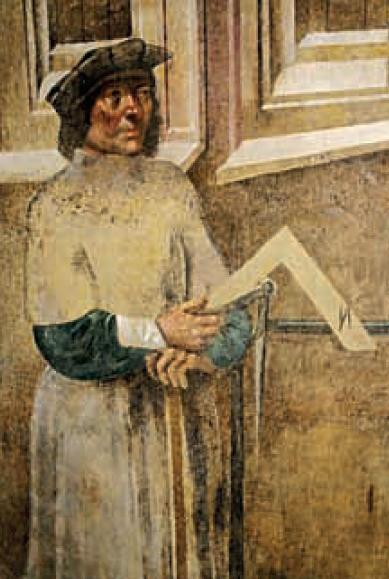
- A probable portrait of Benedikt Rejt, detail of the painting Danish king Eric comes to see St. Wenceslas Church in the St. Wenceslas Chapel of St. Vitus Cathedral, Prague
- Born: Benedikt Ried c. 1450
- Died: between 1531 and 1536
- Known for: Architecture
- Notable work: Vladislav Hall in Prague, St. Barbara's Church in Kutná Hora, St. Anne's Church in Annaberg, St. Nicholas Church in Louny
- Movement: Late Gothic style, sometimes with Renaissance elements (so called Jagiellonian Gothic)

Benedikt Rejt (often spelled Benedikt Ried (Note: also known as Benedikt Rieth, Benedikt Reyd, or Benedict Reijt. In Czech, he often has the epithet "of Pístov" [a village in the Czech Republic or on the Piesting?] or "of Louny"); c. 1450 – between 1531 and 1536) was a leading medieval architect in Bohemia, today's Czech Republic. He built Vladislav Hall (1497–1500) in Prague Castle, St. Barbara's Church, Kutná Hora, (c. 1482) and other buildings in a late Gothic and early Renaissance style.

== Historical context ==
Bohemia became the cultural center of Central Europe when Charles IV brought the Holy Roman Emperor's court to Prague in the 14th century. The Royal Court Workshop under the guidance of Peter Parler was one of the highlights of Gothic architecture in the Holy Roman Empire. The Hussite Wars then stopped all plans for cultural development in the region for many decades.

When Bohemia was again open to Europe after 1480, during the reign of Vladislaus II, good architects were in great demand. The king as well as Bohemian noblemen (the House of Rosenberg being among the richest) searched the surrounding workshops, especially in Danubian countries, for a master builder to realize their projects. The king had a great challenge in the court of Meissen, where Albert III, Duke of Saxony started building Albrechtsburg in 1471.

== Life ==
There is little information about Rejt from historical sources. He was of German origin. The dates of birth and death are unclear as well as the place of origin or early life activity (Mencl guesses the Inn River, probably Burghausen). All the knowledge of his life comes from a few documents, especially those of a judicial character. From these sources it is obvious that Rejt was a renowned architect and baumeister (Latin: magister operis, "master builder") whose opinion was highly valued at court, where he was called to review work of other contemporary architects. As early as 1489 (when he was asked to review the work of Matěj Rejsek), he was considered an authority in the field of architecture. This fact supports the surmise that he had created some of the masterpieces built before that year with unclear authorship. In addition, Prague, Most, Kutná Hora, and Annaberg (the latter two were silver-mining centres at that time) were among the richest cities of Central Europe, and it is likely that only the best architects were invited to work there.

After 1500 he was often referred to as Master Benedikt and a Prague architect and stonemason hired by the Crown. There is also a theory that Rejt can be identified with Benedykt Sandomierski, who rebuilt Piotrków Trybunalski Castle (1519) and other buildings in Poland.

In 1518, Rejt was a chairman and key participant at the congress of architects and stonemasons from all of Central Europe in Annaberg, Saxony. Many hints in historical sources are disputable. According to some of them Rejt came to Prague as a military engineer to rebuild the Prague Castle fortification (he may have built the walls of the castles Rabí and Švihov as well). He then became famous for his skills in the art of Late Gothic vaults, in which art he reached one of the peaks in all medieval architecture. Earlier he was considered an inventor of the tent roof of cathedrals (now typical for churches in Kutná Hora and Louny), but it has been discovered from medieval pictures that their use was more common, and Rejt was probably not an exclusive builder of them. His direct pupil was Jacob Haylmann von Schweinfurt, who worked with him in Kutná Hora and Annaberg.

== Work (with his important participation) ==
=== Prague Castle ===
- Vladislav Hall, the largest medieval vaulted secular room in Europe, completed in 1500
  Ludvík Wing (Louis Palace), considered to be the first Renaissance building in Bohemia (with examples in Italy), later the place of the Second Defenestration of Prague
  Knight's Stairway with an original vault arrangement
- Fortification with the towers of Mihulka and Daliborka (the jail of Bedřich Smetana's opera Dalibor)
- Plans for completing St. Vitus Cathedral, begun but discontinued

=== Bohemia ===
- St. Barbara's Church in Kutná Hora, from 1512 onward on the aisle and vault, supervised by Jacob Haylmann von Schweinfurt and a Hans, after Rejt's death by Master Mikuláš and Jan Vlach, tent roof realized by Master Vaněk; restored in 1884–93 by Josef Mocker and Ludvík Lábler
- St. Nicholas Church in Louny, from 1519, supervised by Pavel of Pardubice and Filip of Wimpfen, probably Rejt's disciples; restored in 1885–92 by Josef Mocker and 1898–1902 by Kamil Hilbert
- Church of the Assumption of the Virgin Mary in Most, mentions of Jörg of Maulbronn; restored in 1882; moved 841 metres to make room for the expanding lignite mines in 1975
- Villa in Stromovka (Bubeneč)

=== Outside Bohemia ===
- St. Anne's Church in Annaberg
- Castle in Ząbkowice Śląskie (Frankenstein), for Münsterberg nobility from 1524 onward

== Work of more disputable authorship ==
=== Buildings usually assigned to Johannes Spiess (Hans, Hanuš) ===
- Royal Oratory in St. Vitus Cathedral
- Vladislav bedroom in Old Palace of Prague Castle
- Parts of St. Peter and Paul's Church in Mělník Palace, chapel and other rooms in Křivoklát Castle

=== Property of Půta Švihovský of Rýzmberk ===
- Švihov Castle, in 1505, fortification system of the moated castle
- Rabí Castle, fortification system of one of the largest castles in Bohemia

=== Property of Zdeněk Lev of Rožmitál ===
- Palace of Zdeněk Lev of Rožmitál in Hradčany
- Blatná Castle, 1523–1530

=== Others ===
- Virgin Mary Chapel (donated by Viktorin Špulíř) in the Church of the Assumption in Jindřichův Hradec, completed in 1506
- Virgin Mary Chapel on Náměť in Kutná Hora, the burial place of Petr Brandl, assigned to Master Blažek from Kutná Hora
- The vault of the Church of the Assumption in Ústí nad Labem, damaged in WWII
- The castle in Březnice, fortification after 1531

== Beneš of Louny ==
In the 19th century, Czech patriots made efforts to claim that Benedikt Rejt had Czech or Bohemian ancestry. In many sources from that time he is referred to under the name Beneš of Louny, e.g., in the Hall of Fame in the 1891 building of National Museum in Prague. According to tradition, he was buried in St. Nicholas Church in Louny. In 1906, Zikmund Winter concluded the discussion with convincing evidence that Rejt was of German origin and that he learnt Czech as fluently as German, as he could be considered Czech (his offspring identified with Czech nationality).

== Legacy ==
A gallery and a square are named after Rejt in Louny. There is also a 20th-century statue of Benedikt Rejt holding a plumb line.

== Gallery of selected works ==
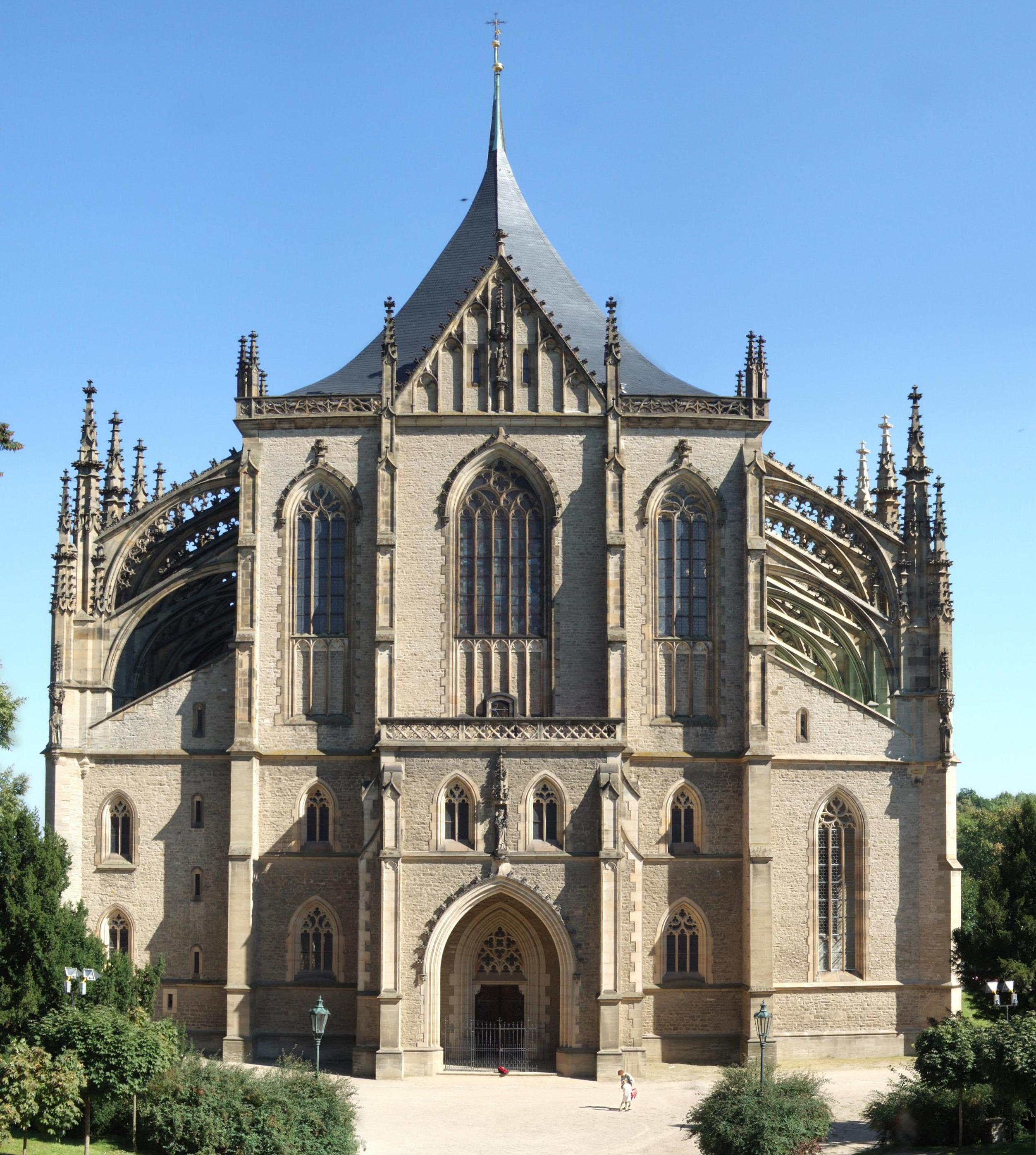
St. Barbara's Church in Kutná Hora

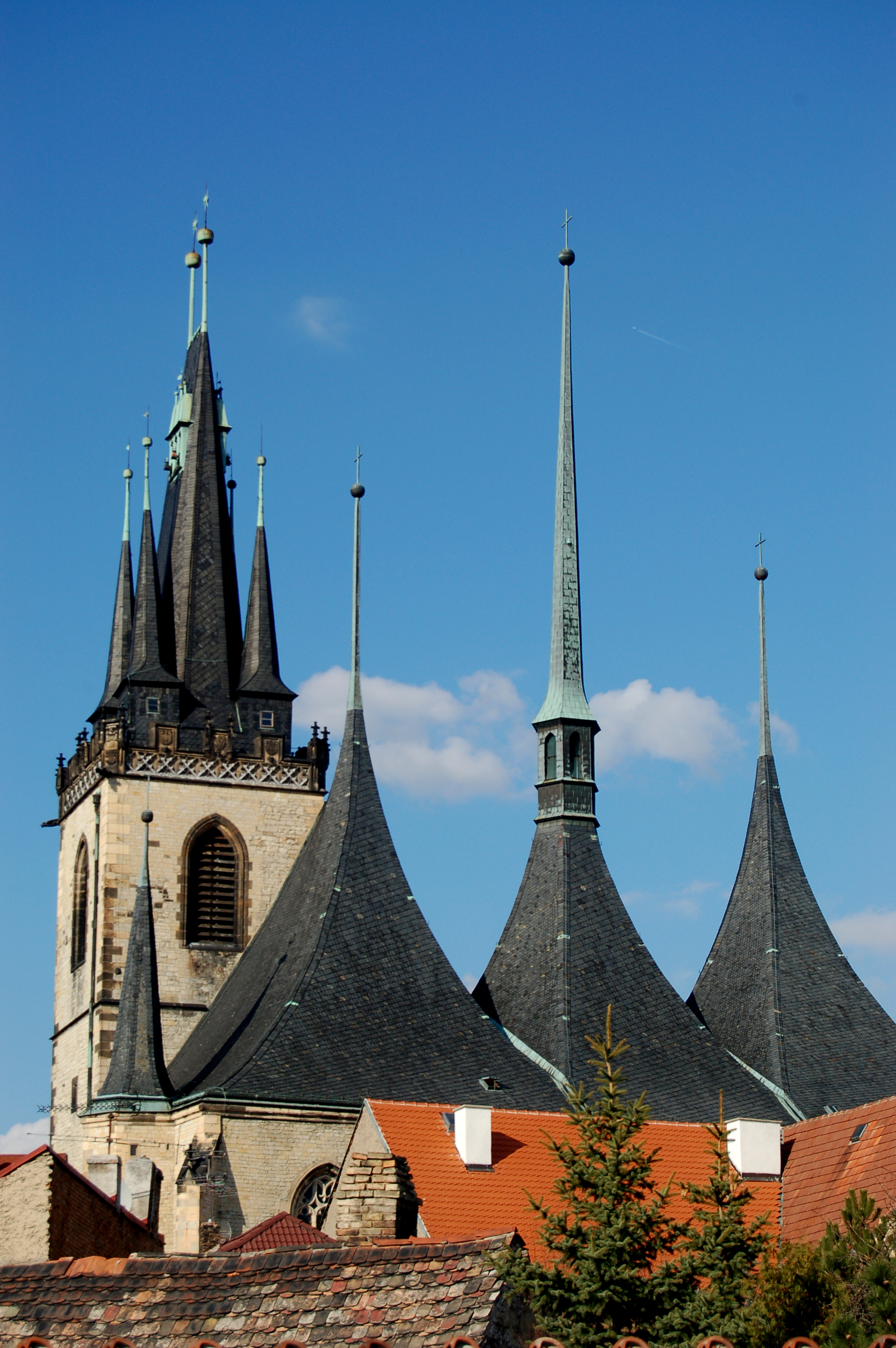
Church of St. Nicholas in Louny

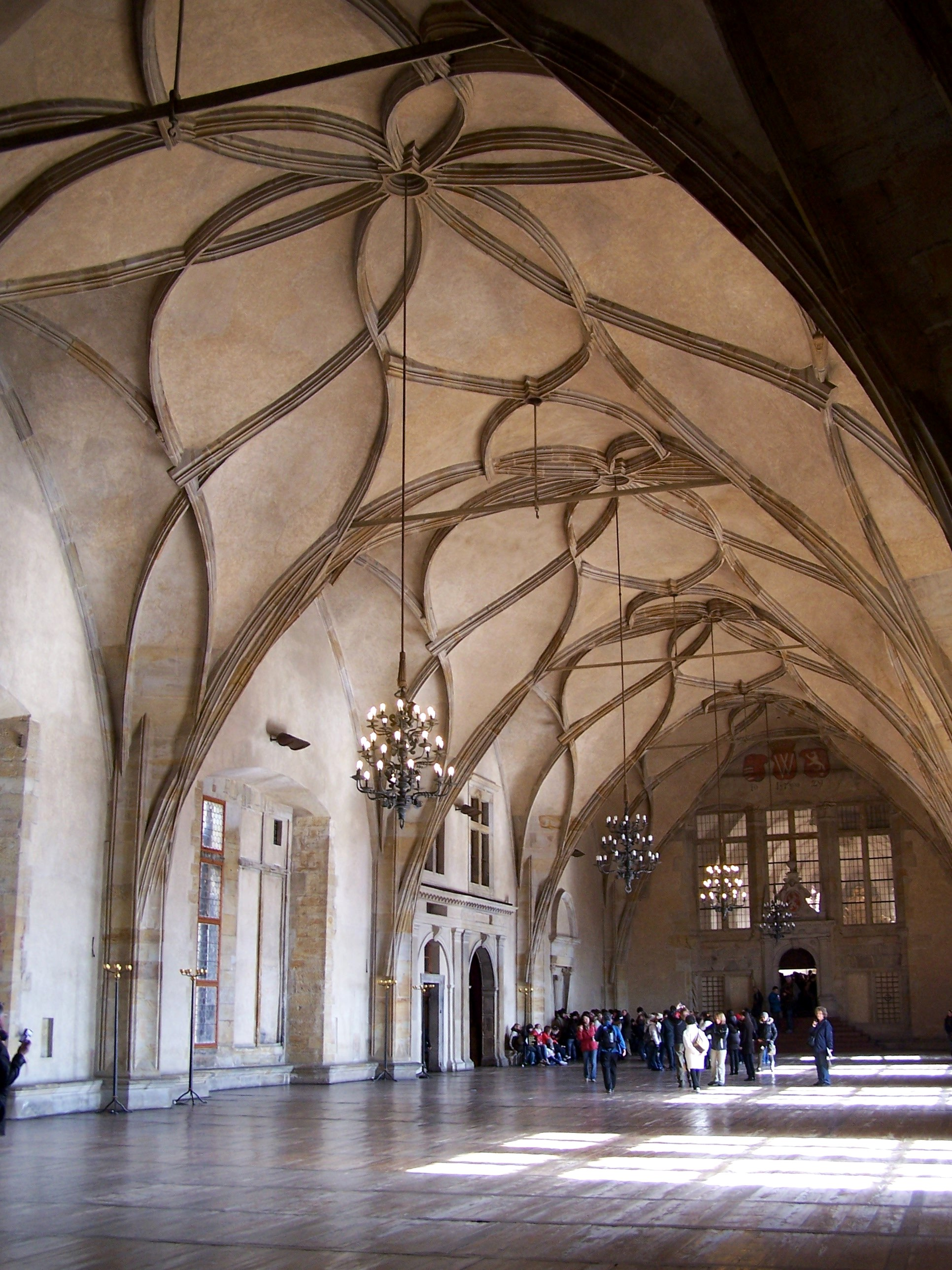
Vladislav Hall at Prague Castle

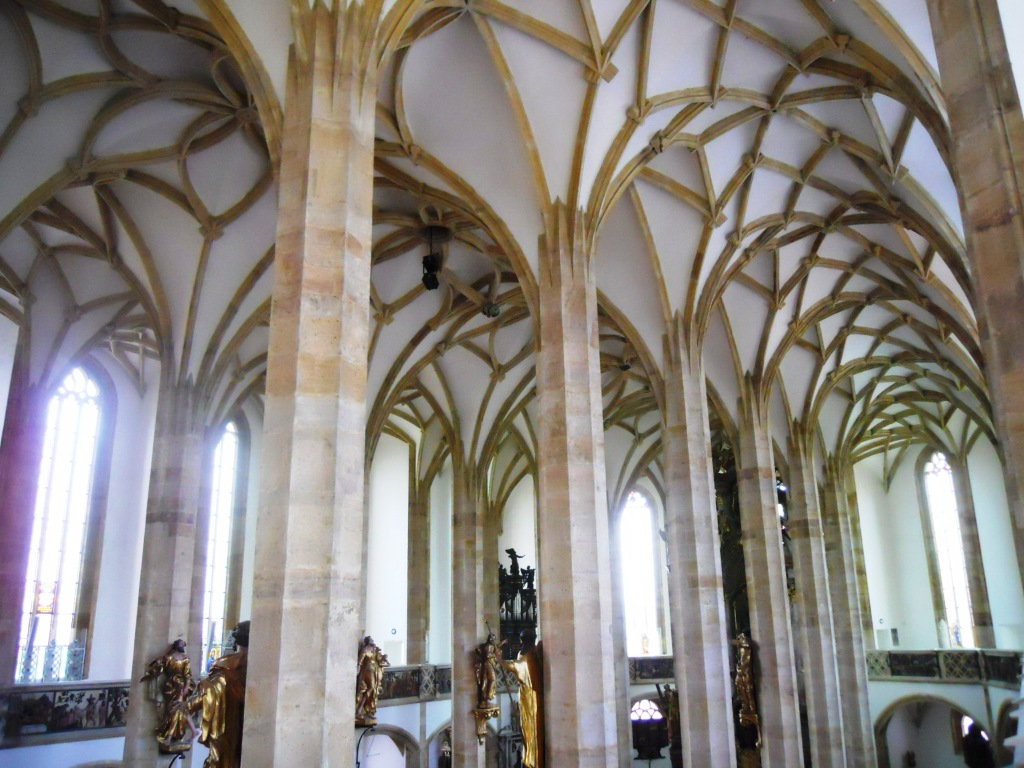
Church of the Assumption of the Virgin Mary in Most
