= St. Barbara's Church, Kutná Hora =

Church in the Czech Republic

- Chrám svaté Barbory
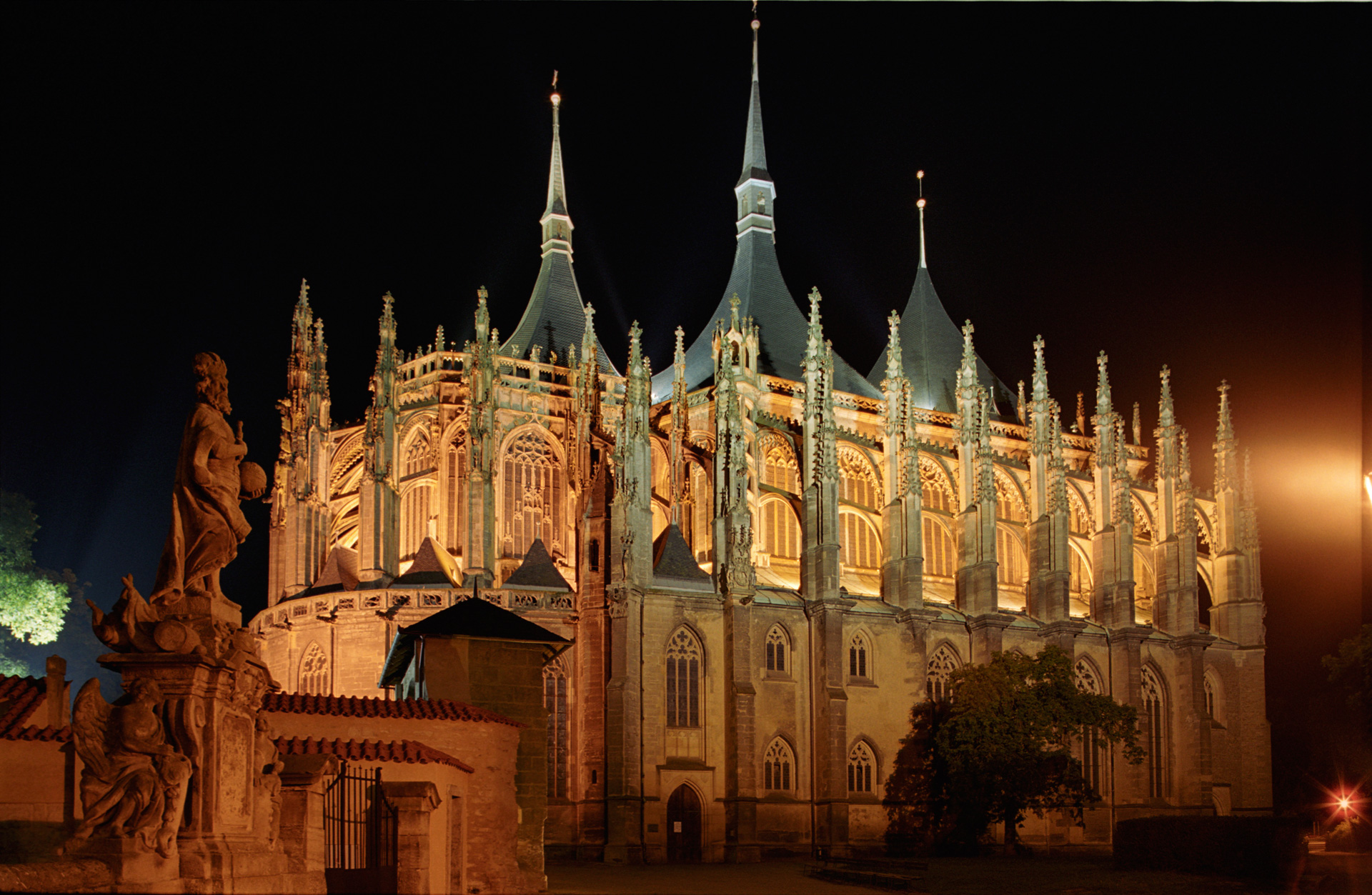

- Location within Czech Republic
- 49°56′42″N 15°15′49″E
- Country: Czech Republic
- Denomination: Roman Catholic
- Website: www.kutnahora.cz

Architecture
- Architect: František Maxmilián Kaňka
- Style: Gothic; Neo-Gothic

Administration
- Diocese: Diocese of Hradec Králové

UNESCO World Heritage Site
- Official name: Kutná Hora: Historical Town Centre with the Church of St Barbara and the Cathedral of Our Lady at Sedlec
- Location: Europe
- Criteria: ii, iv
- Reference: 732
- Inscription: 1995 (19th Session)

Saint Barbara's Church (Czech: Chrám svaté Barbory) is a Roman Catholic Church in Kutná Hora (Bohemia) in the style of a cathedral, and is sometimes referred to as the Cathedral of St Barbara (Czech: Katedrála sv. panny Barbory). It is one of the most famous Gothic churches in central Europe and it is a UNESCO World Heritage Site. St Barbara is the patron saint of miners (among others), which was highly appropriate for a town whose wealth was based entirely upon its silver mines.

It is located outside the Old Town district, behind the Jesuit College. The area was formerly outside of the town.

== History ==
Construction began in 1388, but because work on the church was interrupted several times, it was not completed until 1905. The first architect was probably Johann Parler, son of Peter Parler. Work on the building was interrupted for more than 60 years during the Hussite Wars and when work resumed in 1481, Matěj Rejsek, Benedikt Rejt and Mikuláš Parler, assumed responsibility.

The original design was for a much larger church, perhaps twice the size of the present building. Construction, however, depended on the prosperity of the town's silver mines, which became much less productive. So, in 1588, the three-peaked roof had been completed, and a provisional wall was constructed. A little later it was occupied by Jesuits who gradually changed the structure into Baroque style, though parts still remain in Gothic style.

The final process of repair and completion took place at the end of the 19th century, under architects J. Mocker and L. Labler.

Originally there were eight radial chapels with trapezoidal interiors. Later on, the choir was constructed, supported by double-arched flying buttresses.

Internal points of note are the glass windows, altars, pulpits and choir stalls. Medieval frescoes depicting the secular life of the medieval mining town and religious themes have been partially preserved.

== See also ==
- List of Gothic Cathedrals in Europe

== Gallery ==
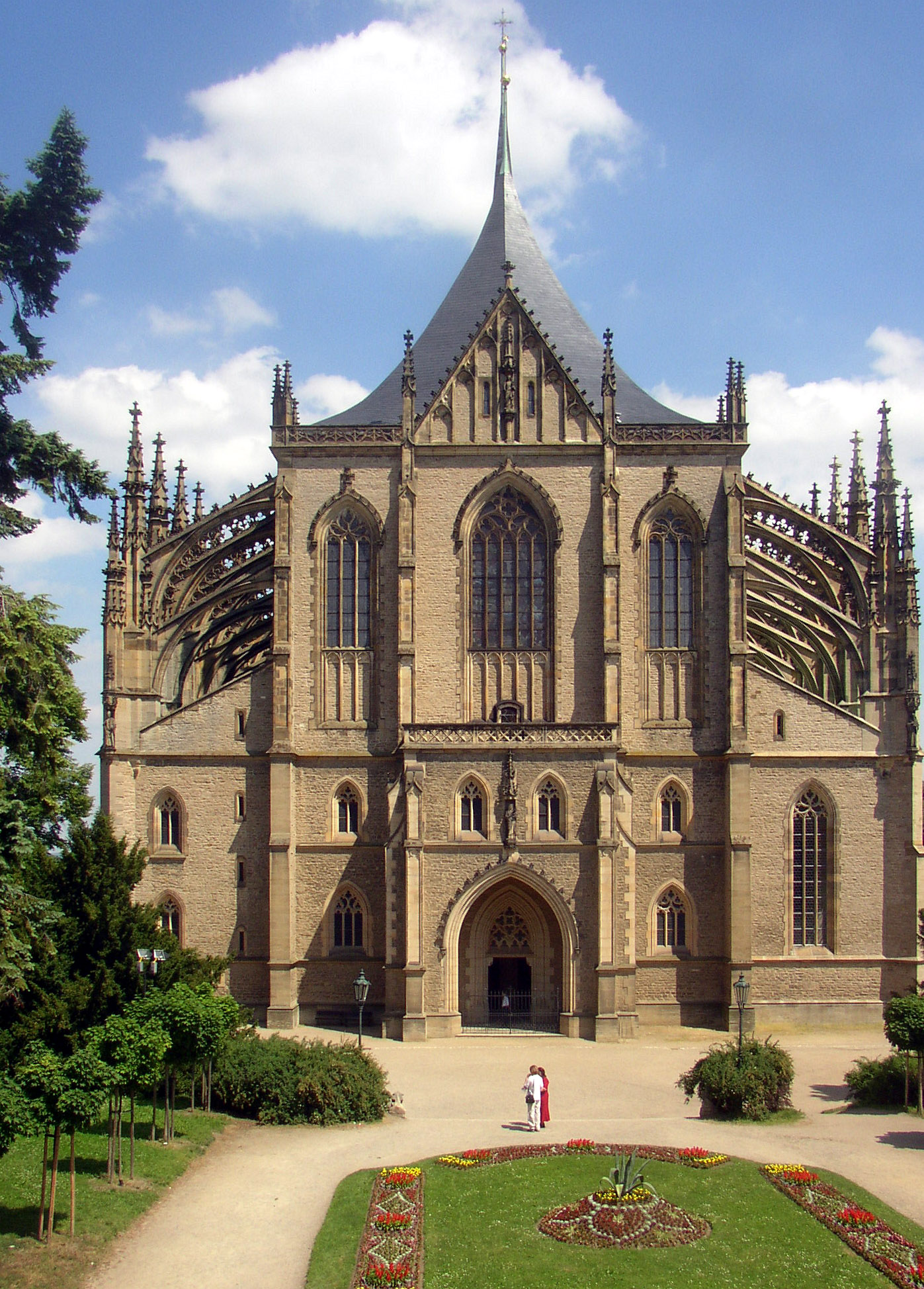
Front view

Interior

Organ decoration

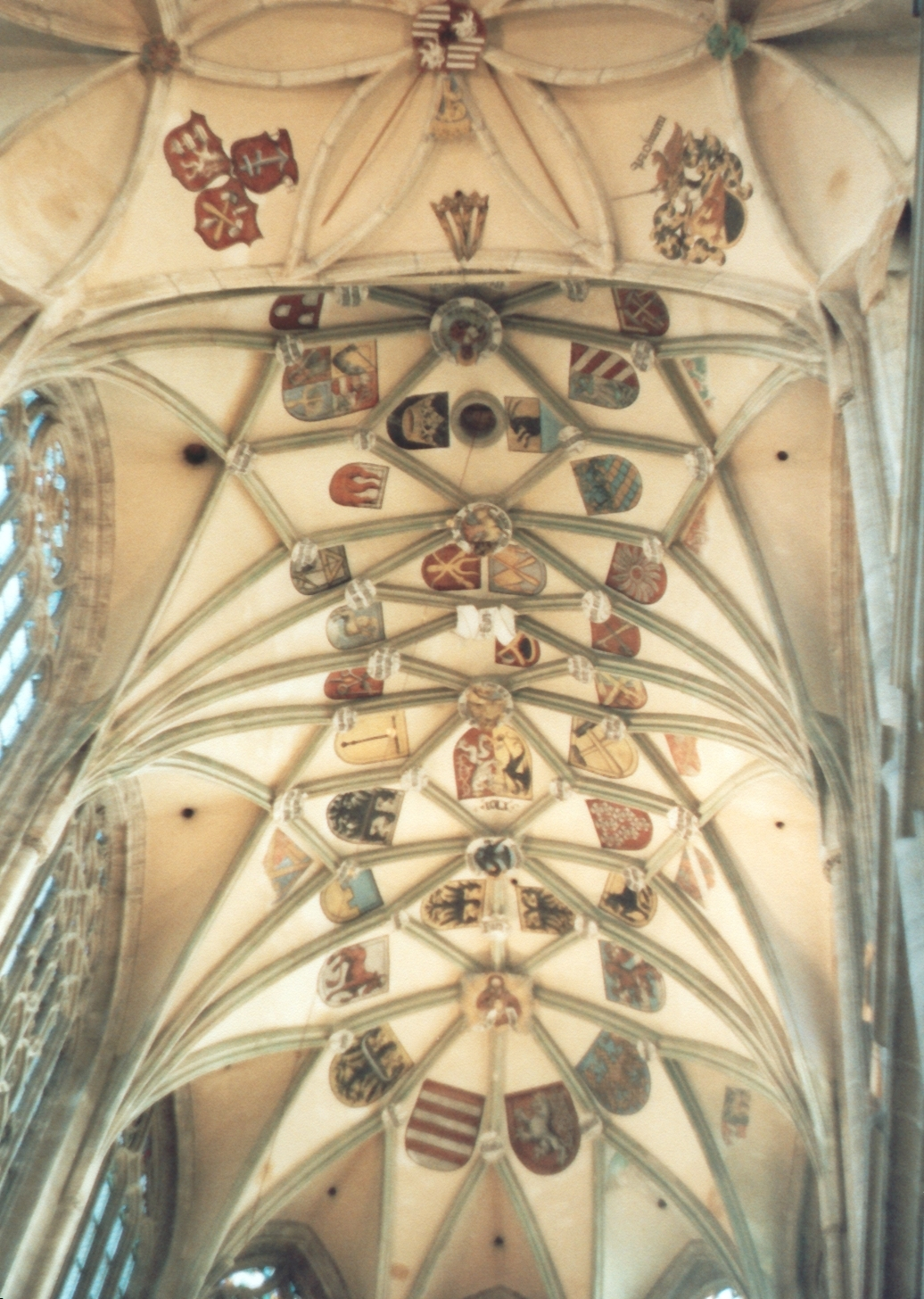
Ceiling Vault

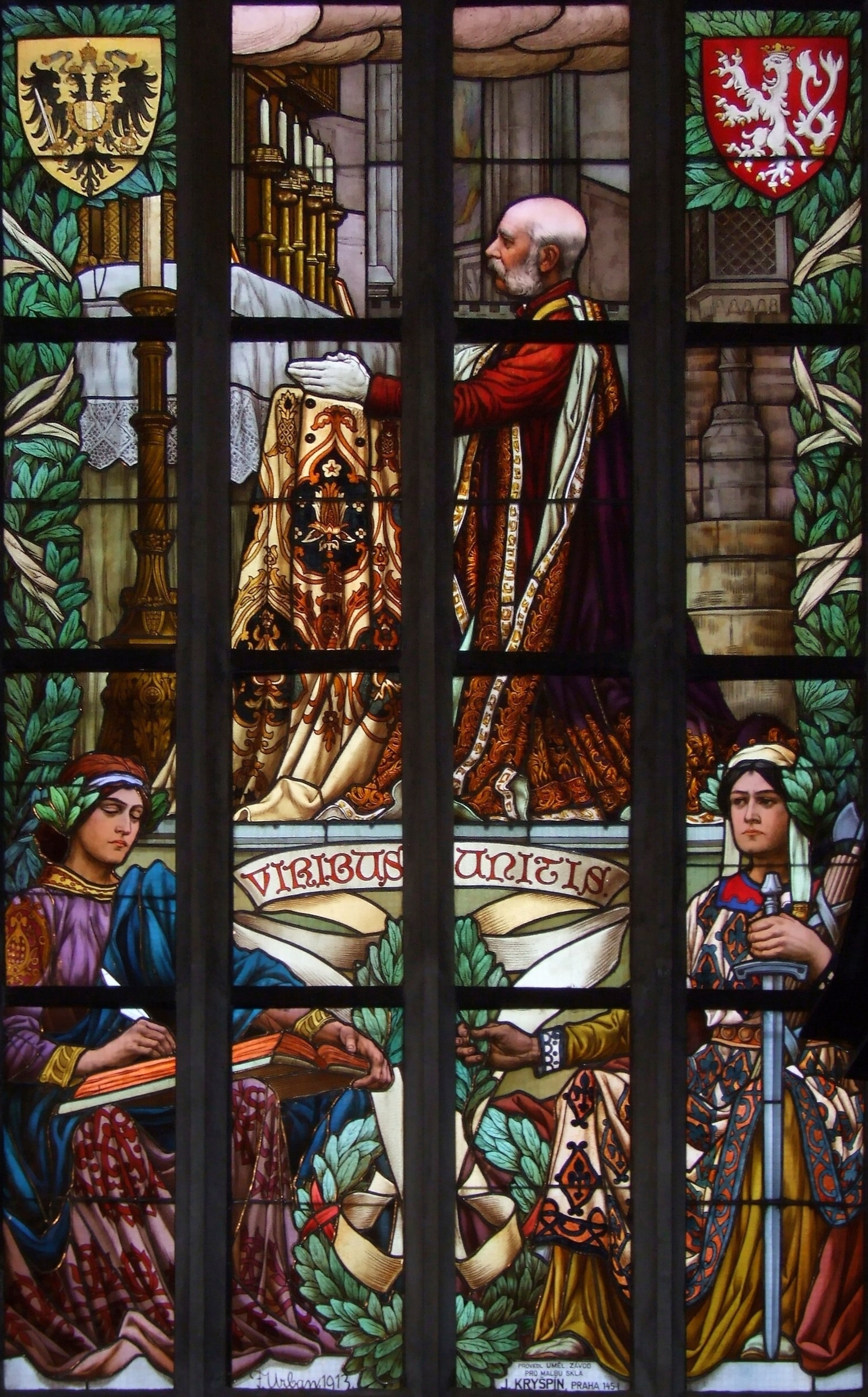
Stained glass depicting emperor Franz Joseph I
