= Kurt Gerstenberg =

German art historian

Kurt Gerstenberg (23 July 1886, Chemnitz − 2 November 1968, Würzburg) was a German art historian, a doctoral student of Heinrich Wölfflin. Gerstenberg's 1913 work Deutsche Sondergotik (German Special Gothic) gave the name to Sondergotik, a style of Late Gothic architecture.
