= St. Anne's Church, Annaberg-Buchholz =

Coordinates: 50°34′43″N 13°00′19″E

St Anne's Church
- Annenkirche
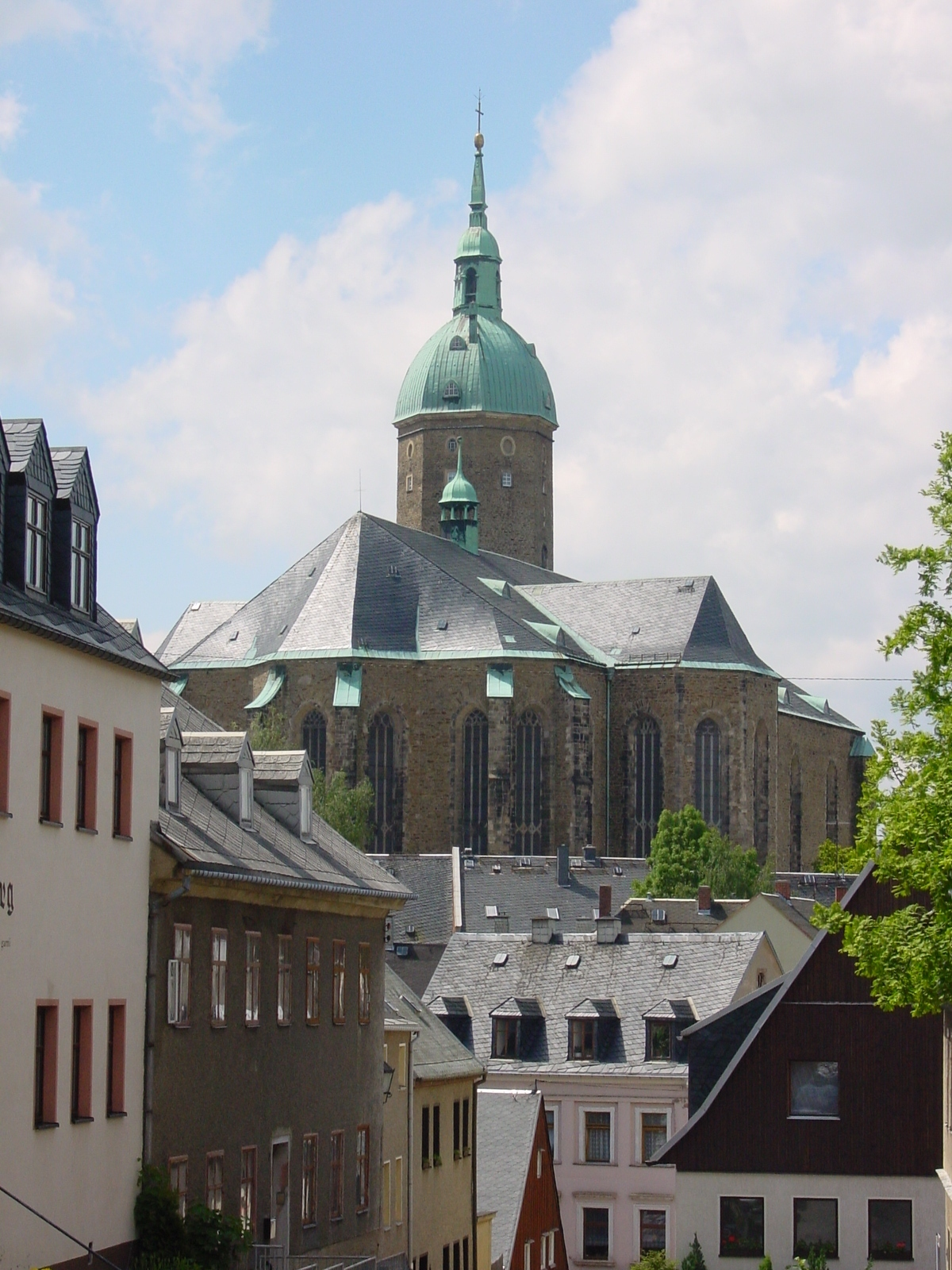
- St Anne's Church in Annaberg-Buchholz

- Location within Saxony Location within Germany
- Country: Germany
- Denomination: Lutheran
- Previous denomination: Roman Catholic
- Website: www.annenkirche.de

History
- Status: Parish church
- Dedication: Saint Anne

St. Anne's Church (German: St.-Annen-Kirche) in Annaberg-Buchholz is a hall church in the Free State of Saxony, Germany, whose architectural style is on the boundary between the Late Gothic and Saxon Renaissance. With a length of 65 metres (213 ft) and width of 40 metres (130 ft), it is the largest, true hall church of the Late Gothic in Saxony. Its tower is 78 metres (256 ft) high, the interior of the church 28 metres (92 ft) high. It is the emblem of the town and visible from a long way off. Saint Anne's was originally built in 1499 as a Roman Catholic church, but became Lutheran in 1539.

== Art-historical importance ==
Interior of St. Anne's Church

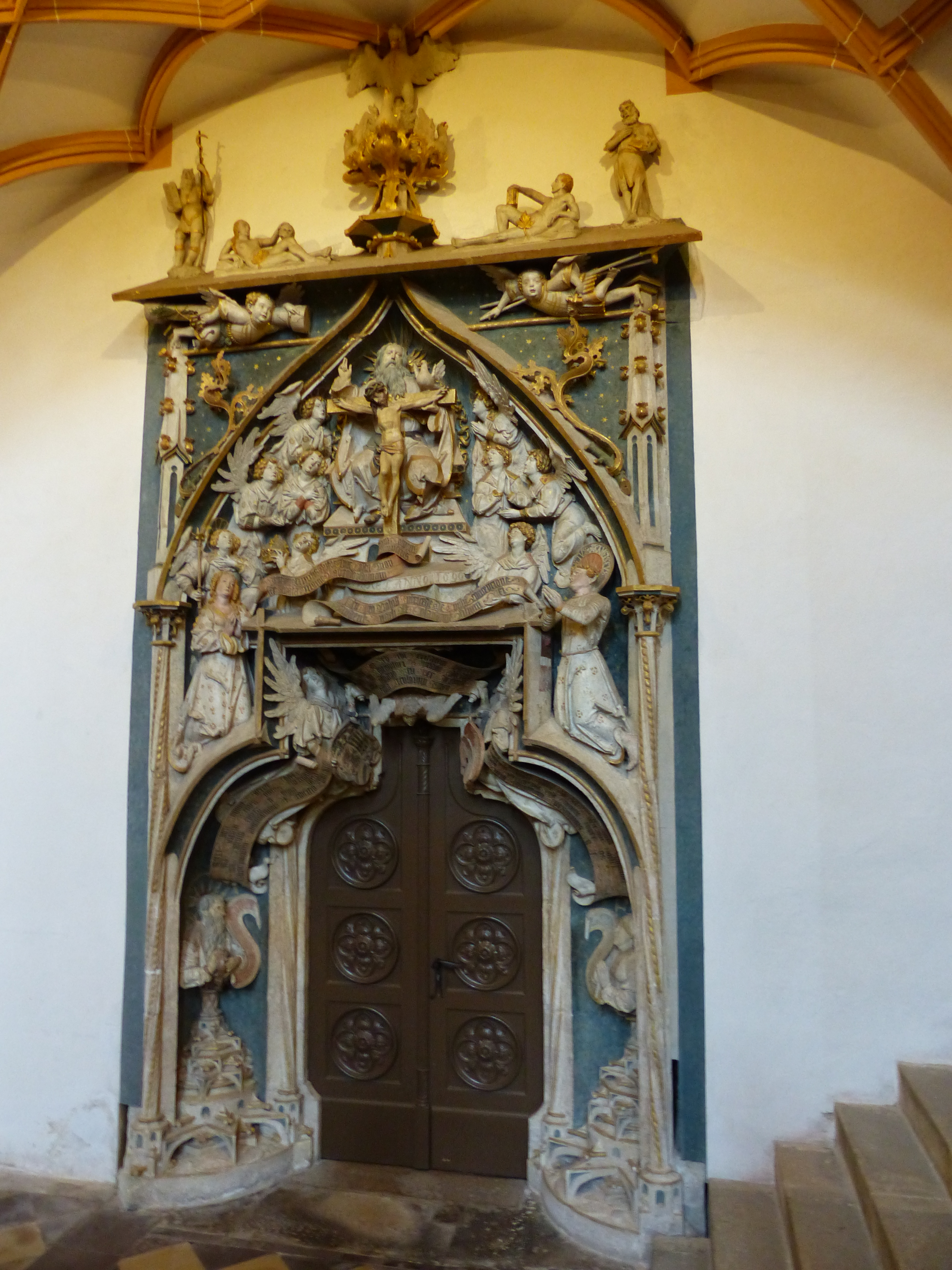
The Schöne Pforte

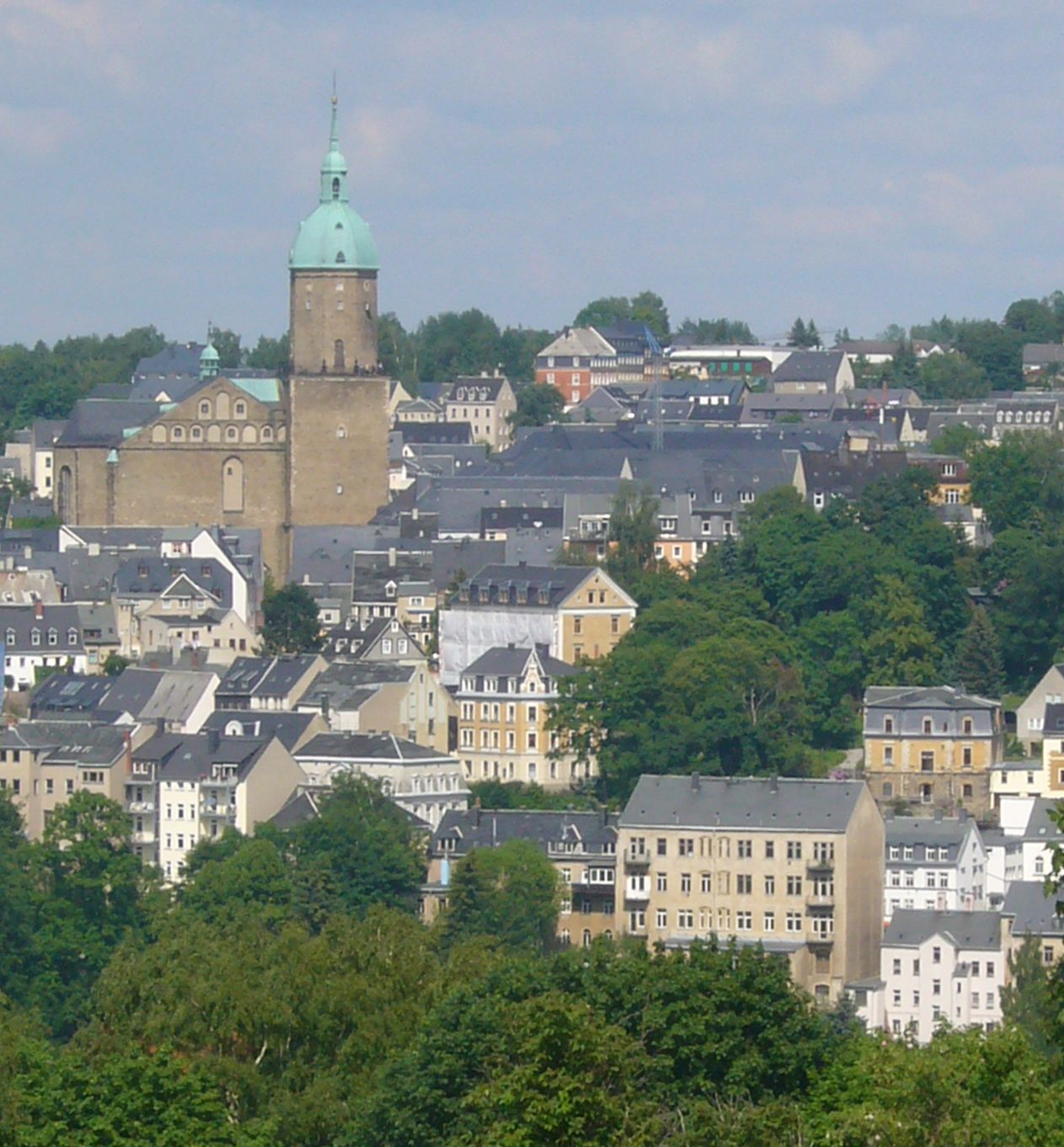
St. Anne's Church viewed from the west

St. Anne's is considered to be one of the most important examples of Late Gothic architecture. Its vivid interior also exhibits aspects of the early Renaissance style of Central Europe. A strong vertical emphasis, typical of the older Gothic, is achieved using tall windows and slender piers that continue uninterrupted into the ribs of the vault. The decorative rib vault, with its imaginative, flowing ribs, is a masterpiece of the Central European Sondergotik. The style of the Italian Renaissance, which is a throw back to antiquity, is reflected in places in the architectural sculpture and altar pieces.

St. Anne's Church is the most advanced representative of a range of religious buildings that emerged in the late 15th and early 16th centuries especially in upper Saxony. Economic prosperity - promoted by rich silver yields - resulted in an intensive period of construction in the Ore Mountains at that time. The hall-church design of St. Anne's interior is reflected in other churches such as Freiberg Cathedral, St. Mary's at Marienberg and St. Wolfgang's at Schneeberg.

In a renovation programme that lasted more than 20 years, many later alterations and changes were removed so that the inside of St. Anne's Church today has been substantially restored to its original state in the 16th century.

The Schöne Pforte portal in the church was relocated from the dissolved Franciscan monastery in Annaberg in 1577 and is decorated with the coats of arms of Saxony and Poland, a remnant of the founders George, Duke of Saxony and Barbara Jagiellon.

== Sources ==
- Hans Burckhardt: Kruzifixe und Kreuzigungsgruppen in der St. Annenkirche zu Annaberg. in: Sächsische Heimatblätter, Ed. 6/1981, pp. 275–283.
- Heinrich Magirius: Die St.-Annen-Kirche zu Annaberg. Berlin, 1985. (Reihe Das christliche Denkmal).
- Heinrich Magirius: St. Annen zu Annaberg. Schnell & Steiner, München/Zürich, 1991. (Reihe: Großer Kunstführer).
- Hans Burckhardt: Dich ruft mein Ton zum Dienst des Herrn ... Schicksale Annaberger Kirchenglocken. Annaberg-Buchholz, 1998.
- Horst Richter: Restaurierung der St. Annenkirche, Annaberg-Buchholz, Annaberg-Buchholz, 1999. (Kirchenvorstand St. Annen).
- Rolf Kunze: 500 Jahre Annaberg – Die St. Annenkirche, Zeugnis der Blüte bergmännischer Kultur. In: Erzgebirgische Heimatblätter 6/1995, pp. 2–7, ISSN 0232-6078.
