= Vladislav Hall =

Hall within Prague Castle, Czechia

Coordinates: 50°5′26.35″N 14°24′7.11″E

The Vladislav Hall during the reign of Rudolf II. The painting depicts Persian ambassadors sent by Abbas the Great.

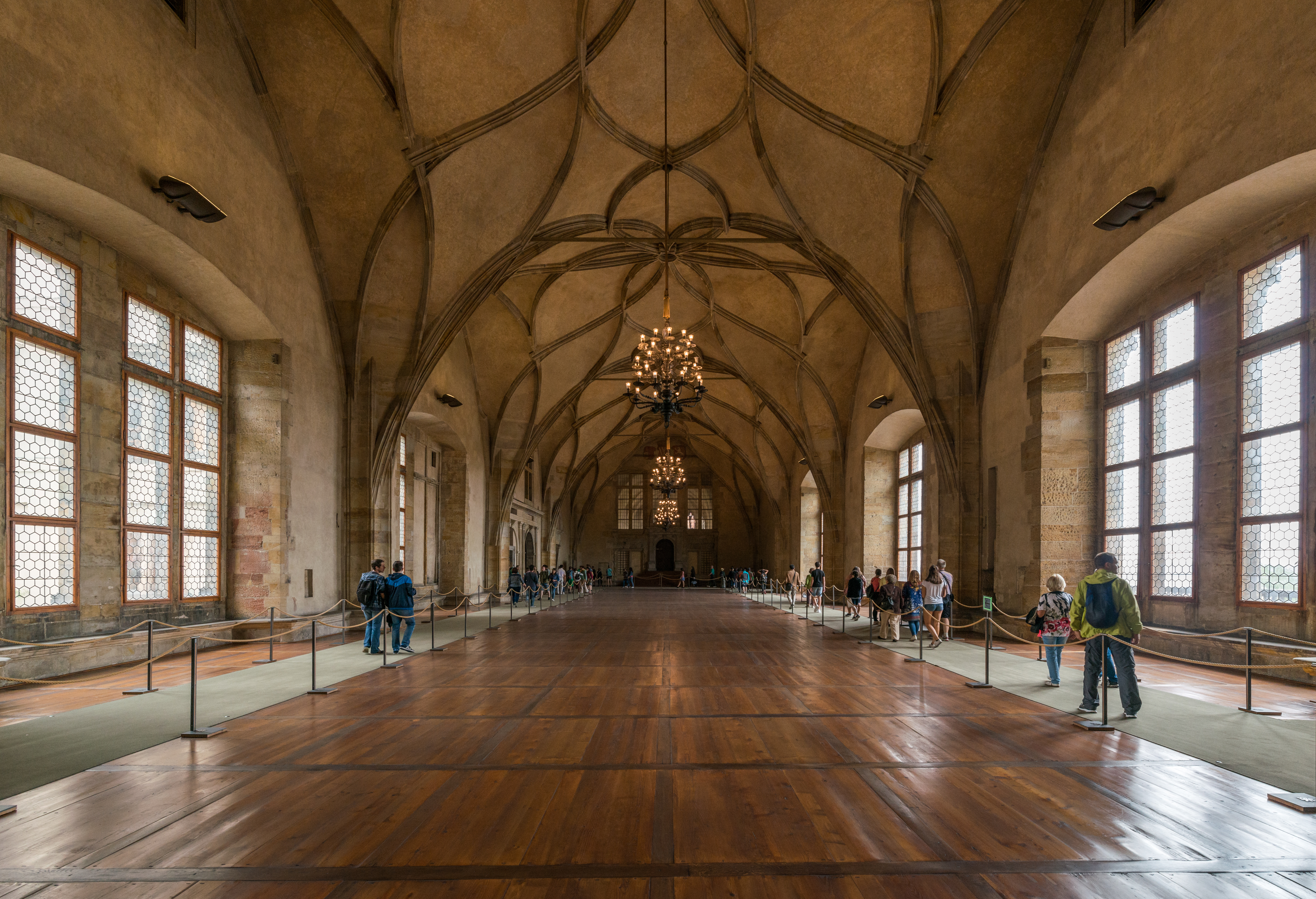
Vladislav Hall today

Vladislav Hall (Czech: Vladislavský sál) is a large hall within the Prague Castle complex in the Czech Republic, used for large public events of the Bohemian monarchy and the modern Czech state. Built between 1493–1502 by Benedikt Rejt during the reign of Vladislav II, the hall was the largest secular space (62m × 16m × 13m) in medieval Prague and is among the most complex structural and architectural spaces of the late Middle Ages. In particular, the construction of the complex stone vaulting system spanning 16m was a refined engineering feat. The third and highest floor of the palace, the hall replaced a group of rooms dating from the 14th century. Immediately underneath, the second floor is a Gothic addition built during the reign of Charles IV, Holy Roman Emperor in the 14th century, while the lowest, first floor is a Romanesque palace.

The hall was used for banquets, receptions, coronations, and other events of the Bohemian court. It was even large enough to accommodate tournaments between knights; the "Knight's Stairway" was built wide enough to accommodate horses to facilitate such activities.
