= Trams in Ulm =

Tram system

Coordinates: 48°24′N 09°59′E

Ulm tramway network
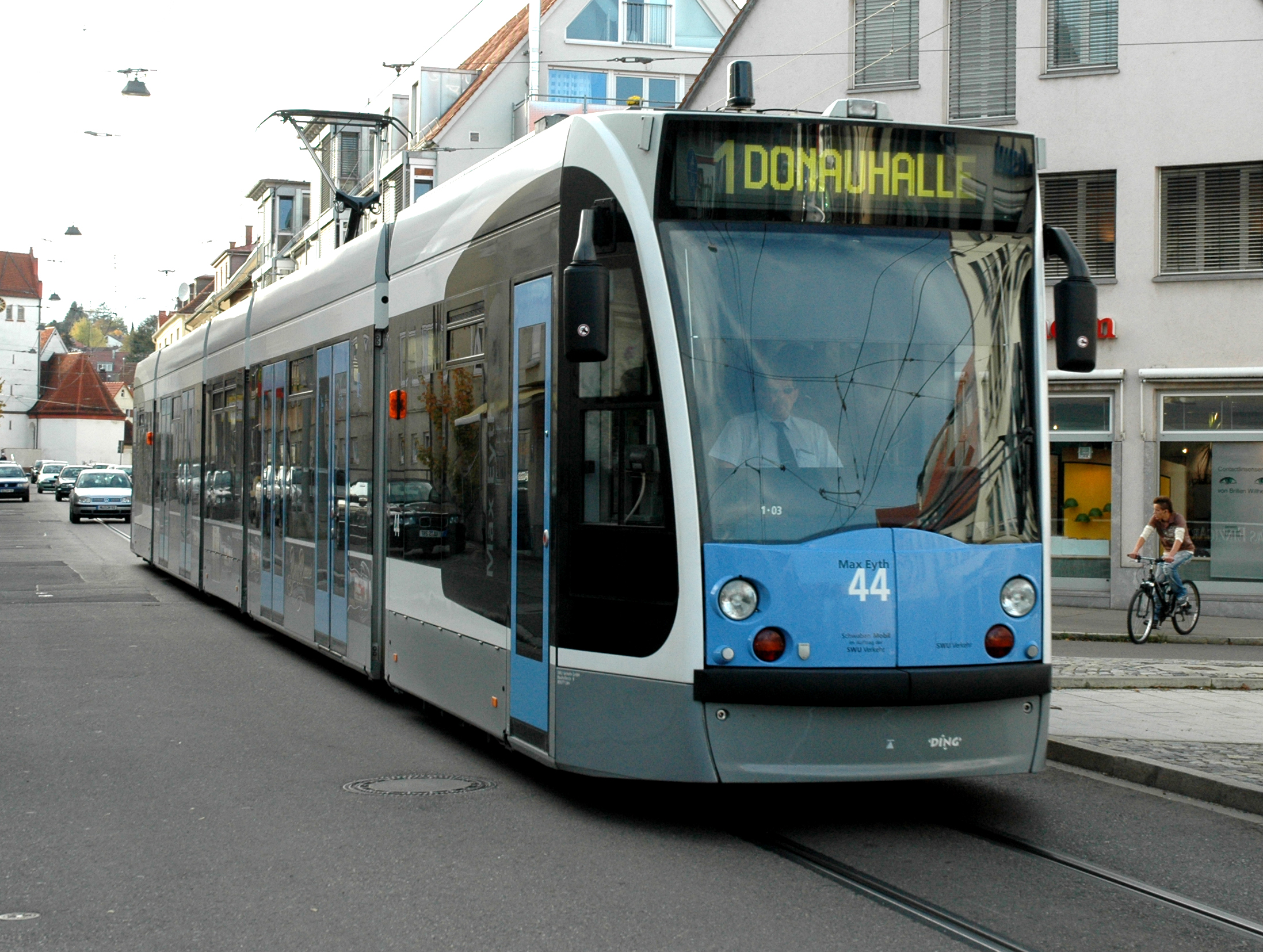
- SWU Siemens Combino tram in Ulm, 2006

Operation
- Locale: Ulm, Baden-Württemberg, Germany
- Open: 1897
- Status: Operational
- Lines: 2
- Operator: Stadtwerke Ulm/Neu-Ulm GmbH (SWU)

Infrastructure
- Track gauge: 1,000 mm (3 ft 3 3/8 in)
- Propulsion system: Electricity
- Stock: 10 Siemens Combino NGT 6 UL (2003), 18 Siemens Avenio M NGT 6 UL

Statistics
- Route length: 19.1 km (11.9 mi)
Overview
- Website: http://www.swu-verkehr.de Stadtwerke Ulm/Neu-Ulm GmbH (in German)

The Ulm tramway network (German: Straßenbahnnetz Ulm) is a network of tramways forming part of the public transport system in Ulm, a city in the federal state of Baden-Württemberg, Germany.

Opened in 1897, the network is currently operated by Stadtwerke Ulm/Neu-Ulm GmbH (SWU), and integrated in the Donau-Iller-Nahverkehrsverbund (DING).

== History ==
The first trams began operation in Ulm on 15 May 1897, running on a ring line linking the main station, Olgastraße, Fraunstraße and Münsterplatz and a second line linking Ulm to the railway station in Neu-Ulm. The trams were originally operated by the privately owned "Ulmer Straßenbahn- und Elektrizitätswerk" until being bought by the city on 1 April 1905. The network was further extended and by 1929 had four lines. Following the Second World War only two of these lines reopened. Following further closures in 1964 only a single 5.6 km long line remained, linking Donauhalle and Söflingen.

Expansion of the network began again in 2007 with the construction of a 4.6 km long extension from Donauhalle to Böfingen, which opened on 21 March 2009. The expansion continued with the opening of the new 9.8 km long line 2 on 8 December 2018, linking Science Park in the north-west of Ulm to Kuhberg in the south-west.

== Lines ==
Line	Route	Length	Stations	Journey time (in minutes)
1	Söflingen – Böfingen Ostpreußenweg	10.3 km	22	30
2	Kuhberg Schulzentrum – Science Park II	9.8 km	21	28

The two lines share almost a kilometre of track in the city centre between Theater and Ehinger Tor, including the tram stop at the main railway station. Germany's highest tram stop is at Botanischer Garten (Botanical Gardens) on line 2, which is 617 m above sea level.

== Rolling stock ==
As of 2024, SWU has ten Combino trams and eighteen Avenio M trams, both types designated NGT 6 UL and manufactured by Siemens Mobility. Each tram is named after a well-known person with a connection to Ulm.

=== Combino trams ===
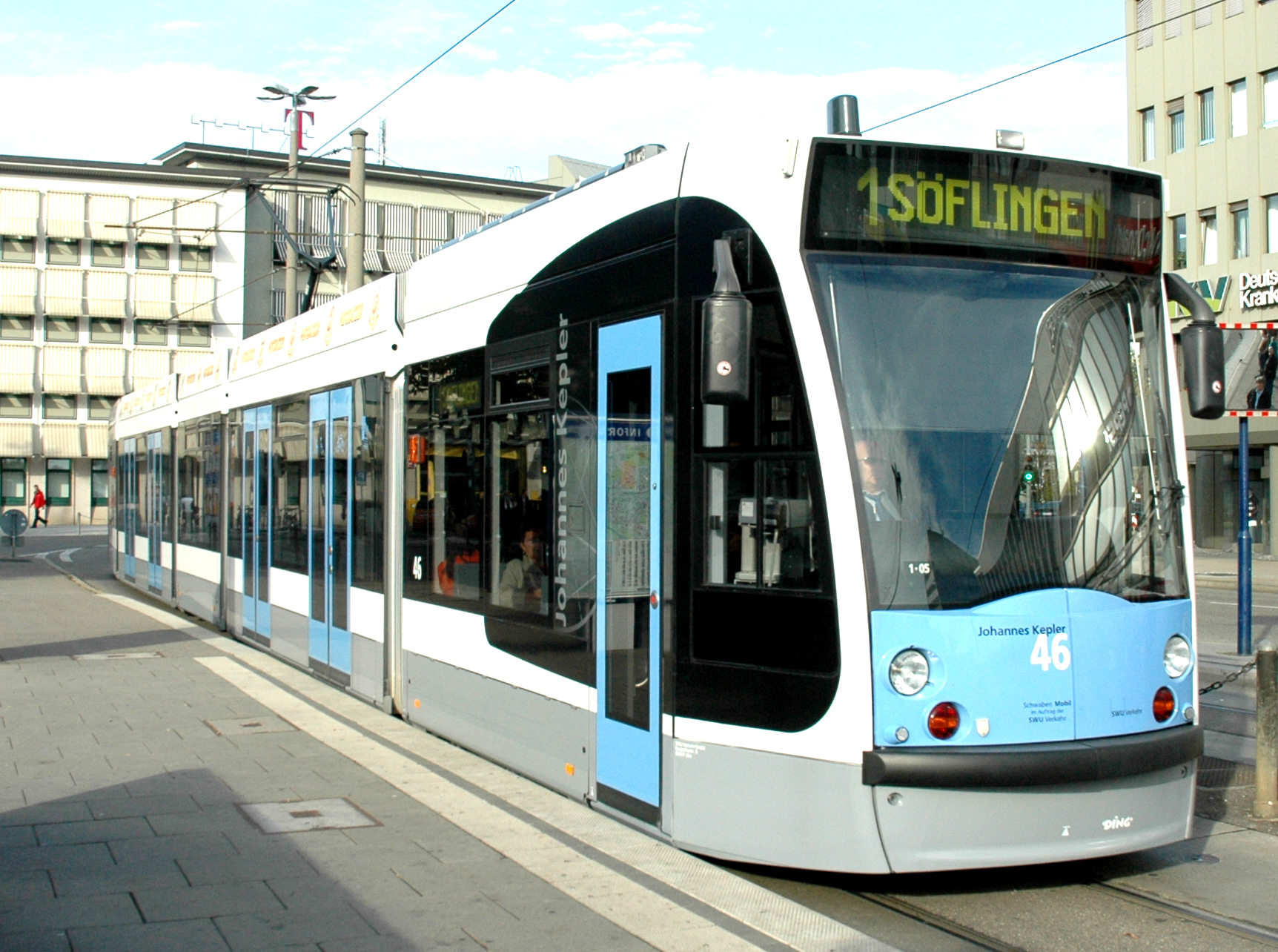
Combino tram outside Ulm Hauptbahnhof

In 2003, the entire previous fleet of GT4 trams was replaced with eight Combino NGT 6 UL vehicles. Two more trams were delivered in 2008 to serve the extended Line 1. The Combino trams are five-section unidirectional vehicles, 31 m long and 2.4 m wide with 72 seats.

Their fleet numbers and names are:

Number	Named after	Delivered
41	Albrecht Berblinger	March 2003
42	Agathe Streicher	April 2003
43	Albert Einstein	May 2003
44	Max Eyth	June 2003
45	Otl Aicher	June 2003
46	Johannes Kepler	June 2003
47	Jörg Syrlin	July 2003
48	Sophie Scholl	July 2003
49	Hans Scholl	December 2008
50	Resi Weglein	December 2008

=== Avenio M trams ===
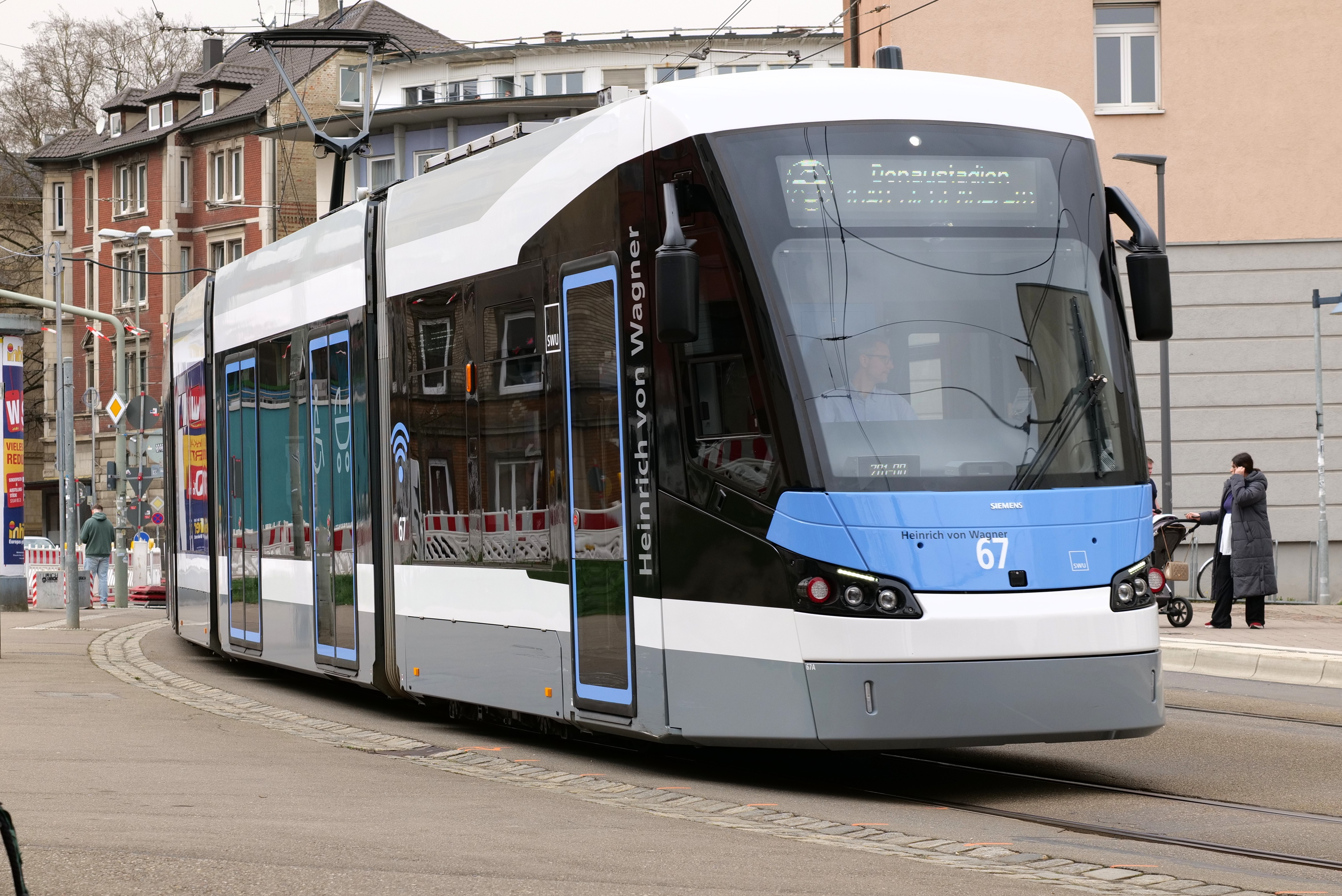
Avenio M tram number 67 in Willy-Brandt-Platz

SWU ordered twelve Avenio M trams in 2015, to be used on the new line 2 when it opened. These also comprise five sections and measure 31 m long and 2.4 m wide. The contract included an option for an additional six vehicles which were ordered in 2020. In 2024 it was announced that all 18 Avenio M trams would be extended with an extra two modules to increase the passenger capacity of each tram from 185 to 256, with the first lengthened tram expected to be in service in 2027.

The fleet numbers and names are:

Number	Named after	Delivered
51	Inge Aicher-Scholl	April 2018
52	Lina Einstein	February 2018
53	Anna Essinger	April 2018
54	Felix Fabri	April 2018
55	Agnes Schultheiß	June 2018
56	Hildegard Knef	July 2018
57	Conrad Dietrich Magirus	August 2018
58	Kurt Schumacher	August 2018
59	Heinrich Parler the Elder	September 2018
60	Mathilde Planck	October 2018
61	"Emmy" (Emilie) Wechßler	October 2018
62	Alfred Moos	November 2018
63	Johannes Scultetus	October 2022
64	Christian Schubart	October 2022
65	Heinz Brenner	November 2022
66	Barbara Kluntz	December 2022
67	Heinrich von Wagner	February 2023
68	Ulrich von Ensingen	June 2023

== See also ==
- List of town tramway systems in Germany
- Trams in Germany

== Bibliography ==
- Riechers, Daniel (1997). 100 Jahre Straßenbahn Ulm/Neu-Ulm [100 Years of the Ulm/Neu-Ulm Tramway] (in German). Ulm.
- Schwandl, Robert (2012). Schwandl's Tram Atlas Deutschland (in German and English) (3rd ed.). Berlin: Robert Schwandl Verlag. p. 138. ISBN 9783936573336.
