= Magirus =

German truck manufacturer

Magirus GmbH
- Type: Private
- Industry: Automotive
- Founded: 1866 (as Magirus Kommanditist); 1974 (Magirus-Deutz); 1983 (IVECO Magirus)
- Founder: Conrad Dietrich Magirus
- Defunct: 1936 (As Magirus Kommanditist)
- Headquarters: Ulm, Baden-Württemberg, Germany
- Number of locations: Production locations: Germany: Ulm; Austria: Graz; France: Chambéry; Italy: Brescia
- Area served: Worldwide
- Key people: Gerrit Marx (COB); Marc Diening (MD)
- Products: Trucks
- Operating income: ▼€1.042 billion (2009)
- Number of employees: 2,100 (2009)
- Parent: Mutares
- Website: www.magirusgroup.com

Iveco Magirus fire engine in Germany

Magirus GmbH is a truck and bus manufacturer based in Ulm, Germany, founded by Conrad Dietrich Magirus (1824–1895). It was formerly part of the Klöckner-Humboldt-Deutz AG (KHD), maker of the Deutz engines, so the brand commonly used was Magirus-Deutz, and for a short time before Klöckner. Most trucks and buses from Magirus were known as Magirus-Deutz. The logo of Magirus-Deutz was a stylised M with a sharp, long centre point to represent the spire of Ulm Minster.

Magirus is one of the largest manufacturers of fire fighting equipment. Its fire trucks are now primarily based upon chassis and engines from Iveco, but occasionally also uses platforms from other truck manufacturers.

IVECO, owner of Magirus since 1980, sold the business in 2024, and Magirus is now an independent business, owned by investment company Mutares SE.

== History ==
The company Magirus began manufacturing fire-fighting vehicles in 1866. In the late 1910s, it started the production of trucks and buses. These vehicles developed a reputation for high engineering standards, able to operate under the most arduous conditions. The company also invented the turntable ladder, as Magirus Leiter, which quickly became an essential item of fire brigade equipment worldwide.

Magirus was deeply involved in World War II supplying vehicles for the Wehrmacht, and gas vans for Chelmno death camp where they were used to murder 180,000 Jews. Jews were also murdered in Magirus gas vans by Einsatzgruppe C in Kharkiv, Poltava and Dnipropetrovsk, by Einsatzgruppe D in Simferopol, Kerch, Crimea and the Don region, by Einsatzgruppe B in Minsk, and Einsatzgruppe A in Latvia. Magirus supplied ladders for mobile V-2 rocket launch sites. The factory used forced labourers, mostly from the Netherlands and Soviet Union, since 1942, and in 1945, also built and controlled a forced labour subcamp of the Dachau concentration camp, which held Italians, Poles, Czechs, Ukrainians and one German. Forced labourers, particularly Jews were worked to death.

In 1975, Magirus became part of Iveco, which continued producing some Magirus trucks for a short while under the name "IVECO Magirus" before abandoning it completely in most countries. KHD's collaboration with FIAT ended abruptly and less than harmoniously in 1979, leaving FIAT as owner of the Magirus brand. However, IVECO trucks with aircooled engines were sold under the Magirus brand in Germany and other European and Middle Eastern markets until the end of the 1980s.

Today, the Magirus brand is only used for the company's firefighting equipment section, not for the whole fleet of manufactured trucks.

=== Airship ladders ===
The Magirus company produced many of the early, movable ladders used in the construction of large, rigid airships in Germany and the United States. The multi-extension, wooden ladders were mounted on massively constructed, wooden carriage frames with a fifth wheel-style, forward axle assembly. Although it appeared to be designed for horses, the ladders could be easily moved by two men. The carriage was equipped with four, hand screw-type "outriggers" that would resist the ladder from tipping. The ladder did not swivel on the carriage. It was elevated and extended only towards the front of the carriage. In the "working" position, the ladder had to be elevated to about an 80° angle to allow full extension to 85 feet (26 m). (The maximum extended length of the largest wooden Magirus ladder is unknown, but the ones used during the erection of the Goodyear-Zeppelin Corporation's USS Akron and USS Macon reached to 85 feet (26 m).)

=== Trucks for the Soviet Union ===
In 1974, the firm was awarded a contract (called the Delta Project) for delivery in 1975/1976 of about 9,500 dumper and flatbed trucks (Magirus-Deutz М232 D19 and M290 D26) to the Soviet Union to work on the construction of the Baikal–Amur Mainline (BAM). This order was the largest in the company's history. These models were export-only options KHD products that were not offered on the domestic market in Germany. By January 1, 1975, for the first batch of Magirus-Deutz trucks for BAM construction was ready to be sent to the Soviet Union. Largely because of this single order, in 1975, export products accounted for 70% of total production by Magirus-Deutz, and the firm took the second place among the German truck manufacturers.

In 1982, Magirus-Deutz erstwhile owners KHD sold the licensing rights for Soviet production of up to 25,000 Series 413 diesel engines. These were meant to be installed in heavy USSR trucks and other vehicles.

=== Acquisition by Mutares ===
Iveco decided to sell the loss-making Magirus business in 2024 to Mutares SE, a transaction which was finalised in January 2025. The entire Magirus business was sold along with the Magirus brand.

== Products ==
=== Current products ===
- Iveco Magirus Eurocargo
- Iveco Magirus Stralis
- Iveco Magirus Trakker
- Iveco Magirus Dragon

== Gallery ==
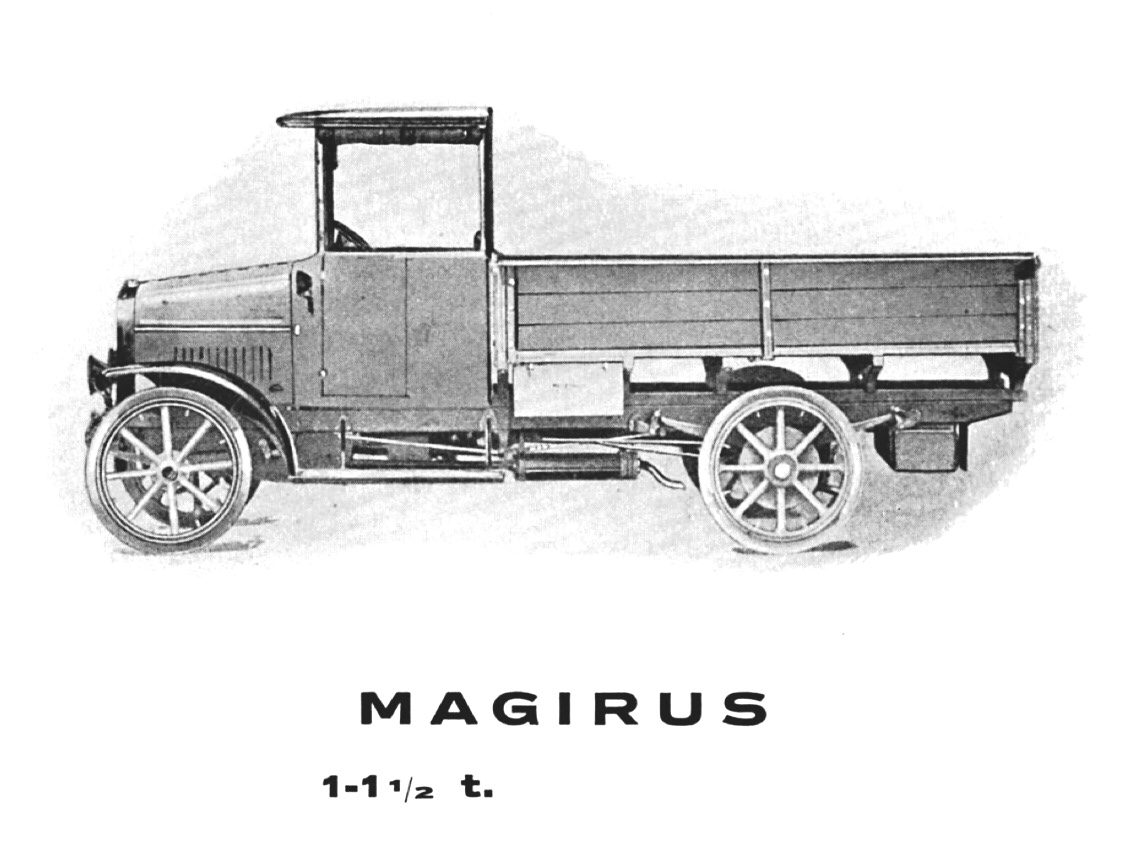
Magirus 1 C (1922-1928)

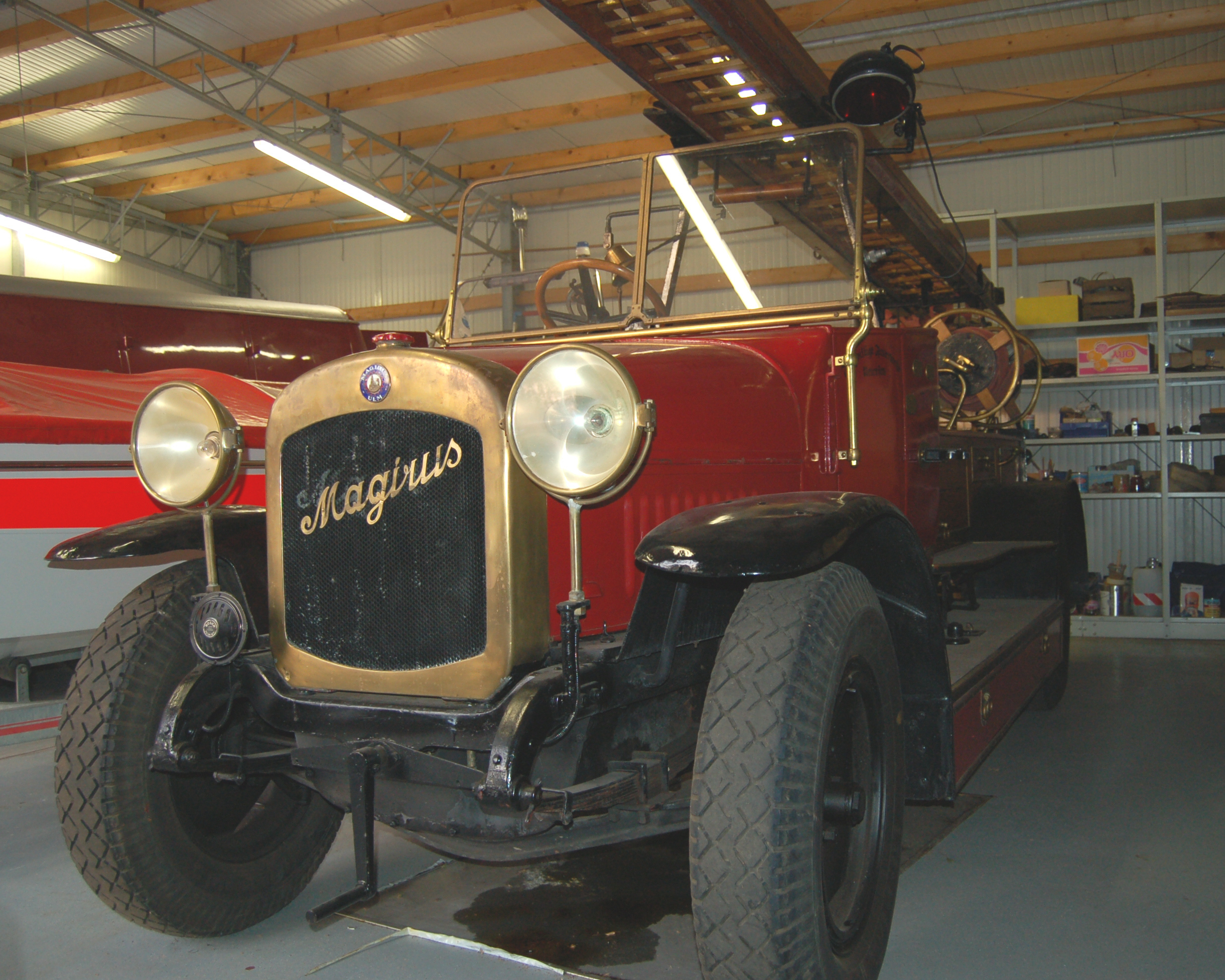
Magirus Fire Engine Model "Bayern" 1923

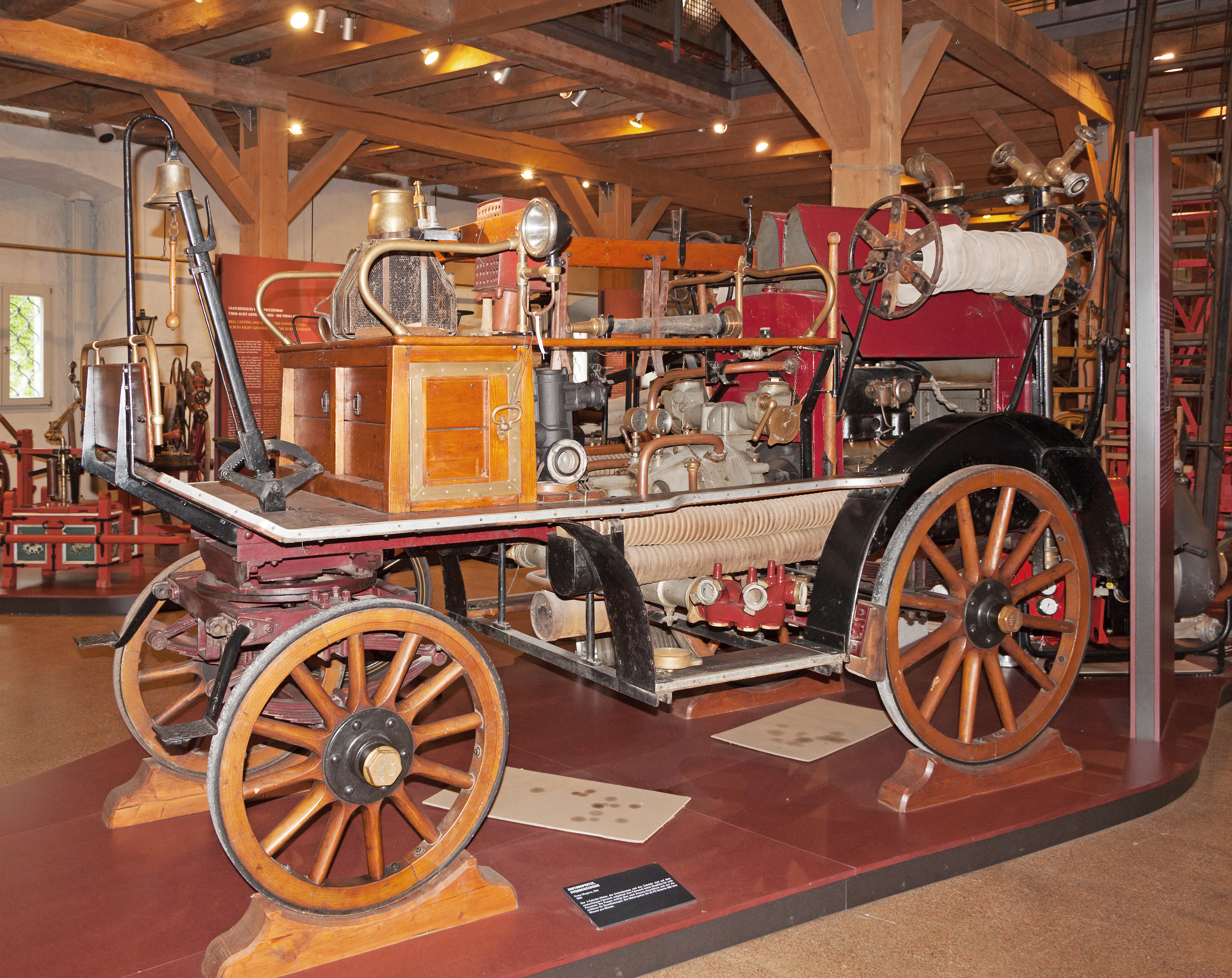
Horse drawn fire engine, 1926

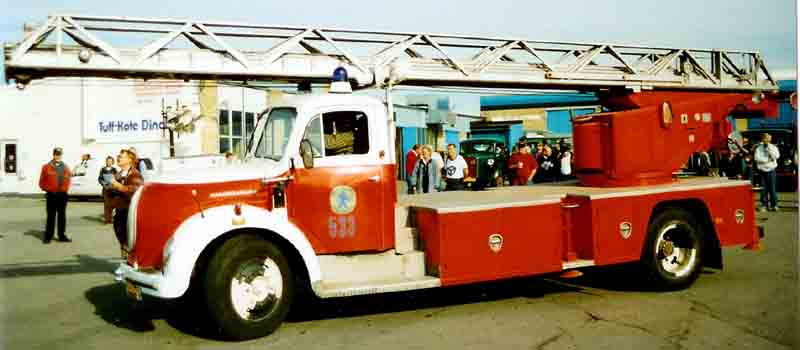
Magirus-Deutz Fire Engine 1961

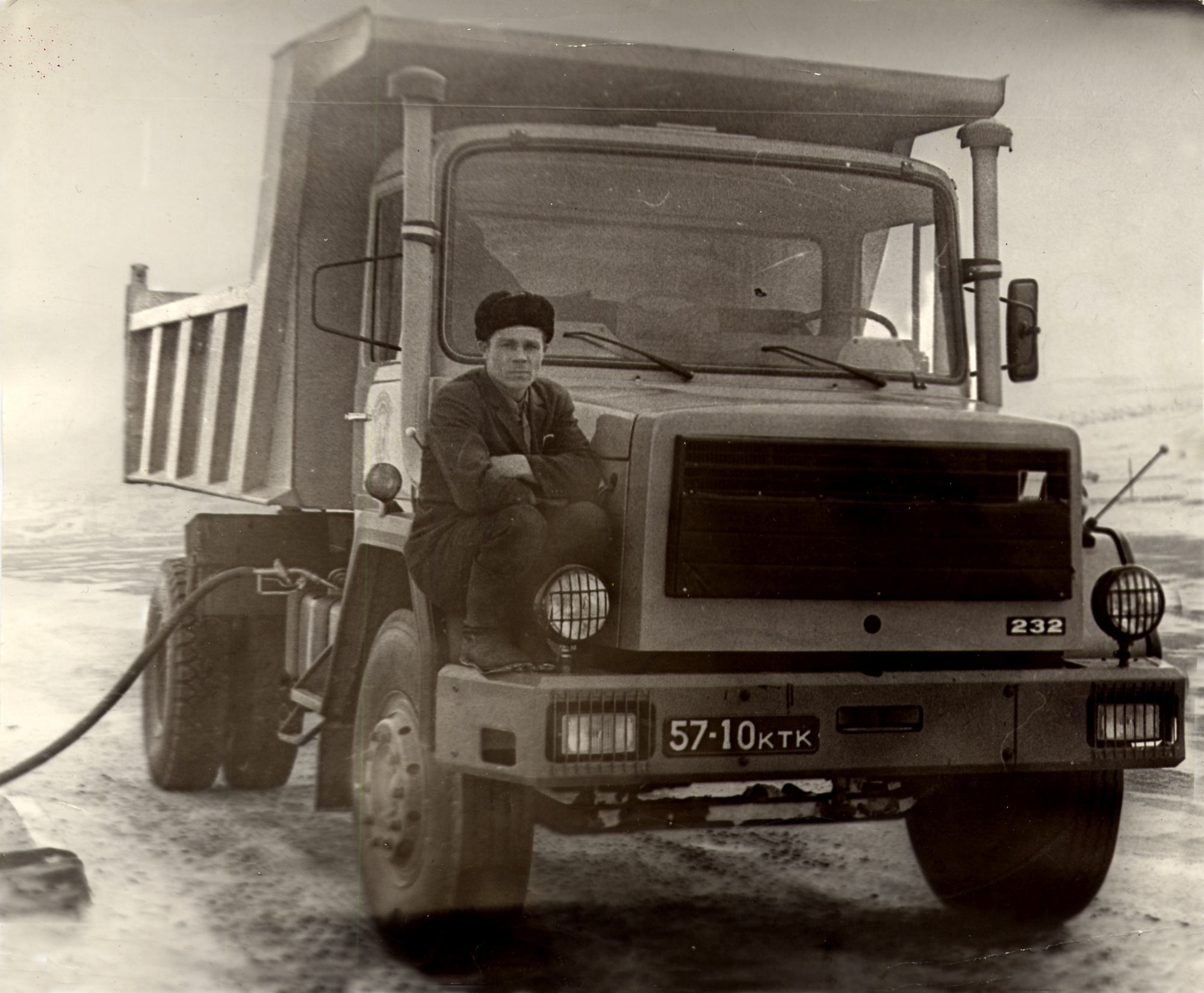
Magirus-Deutz in Kokchetav (now Kokshetau), Kazakh SSR

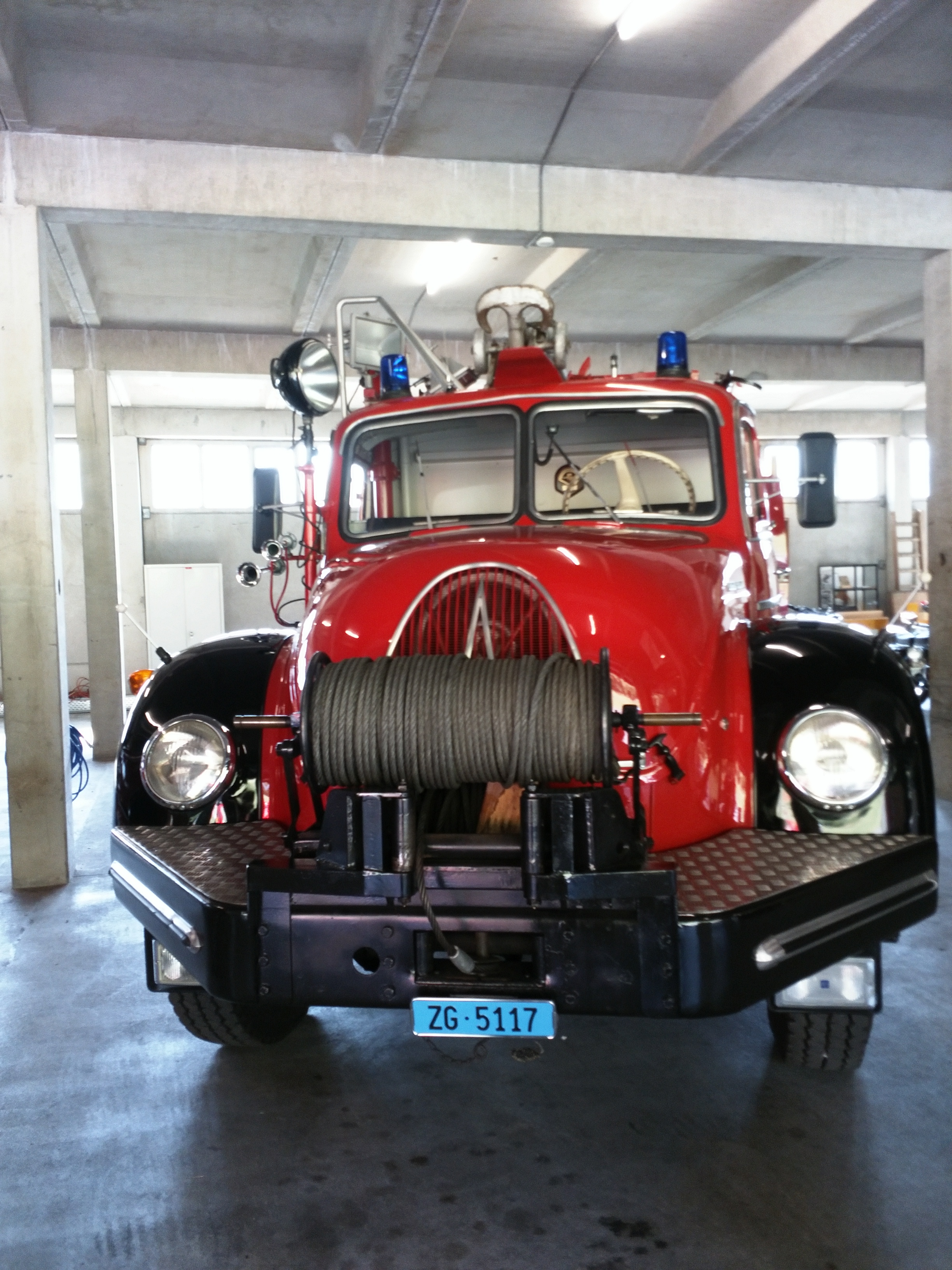
Magirus-Deutz Muni from 1957

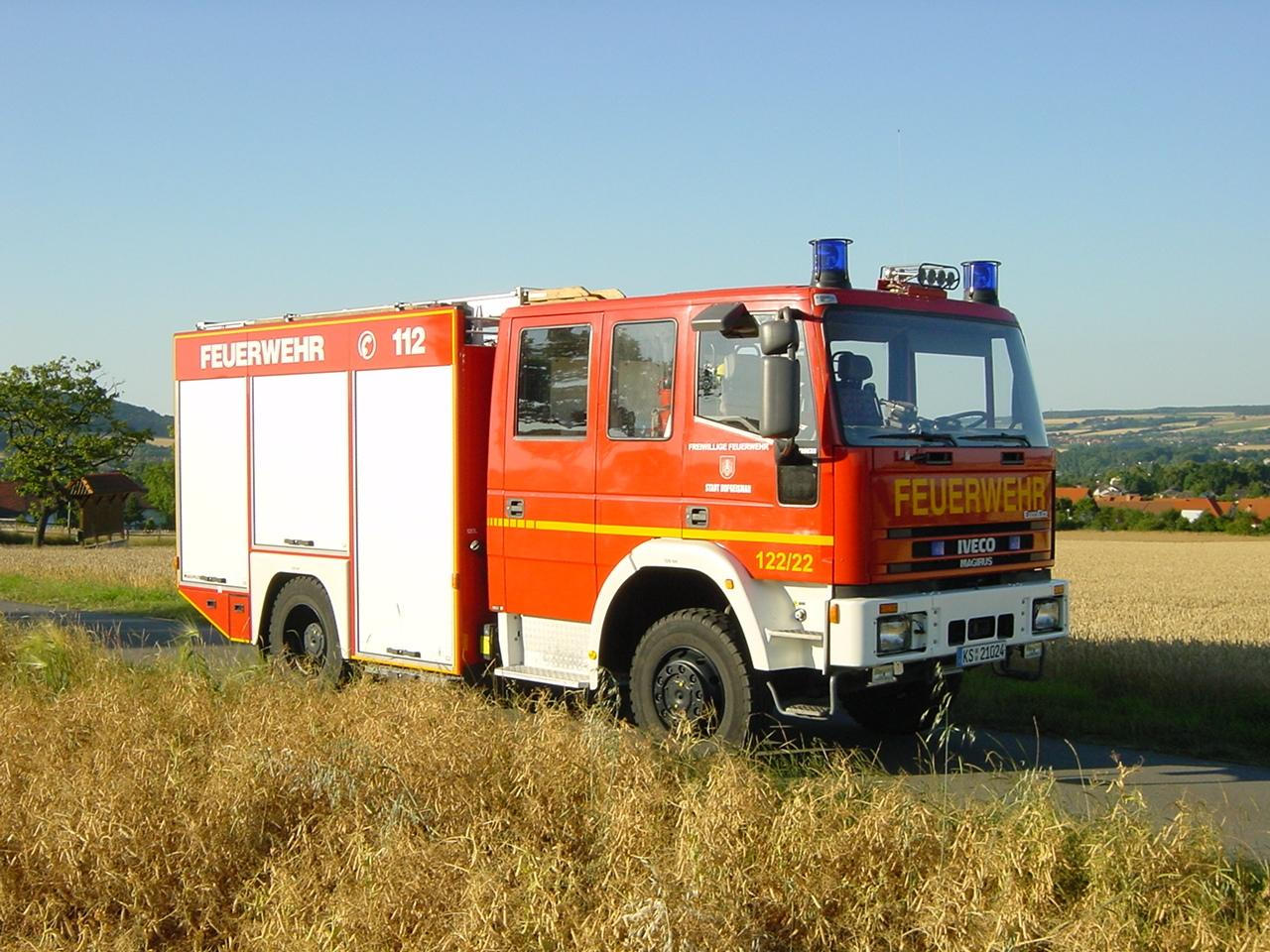
IVECO Magirus fire engine

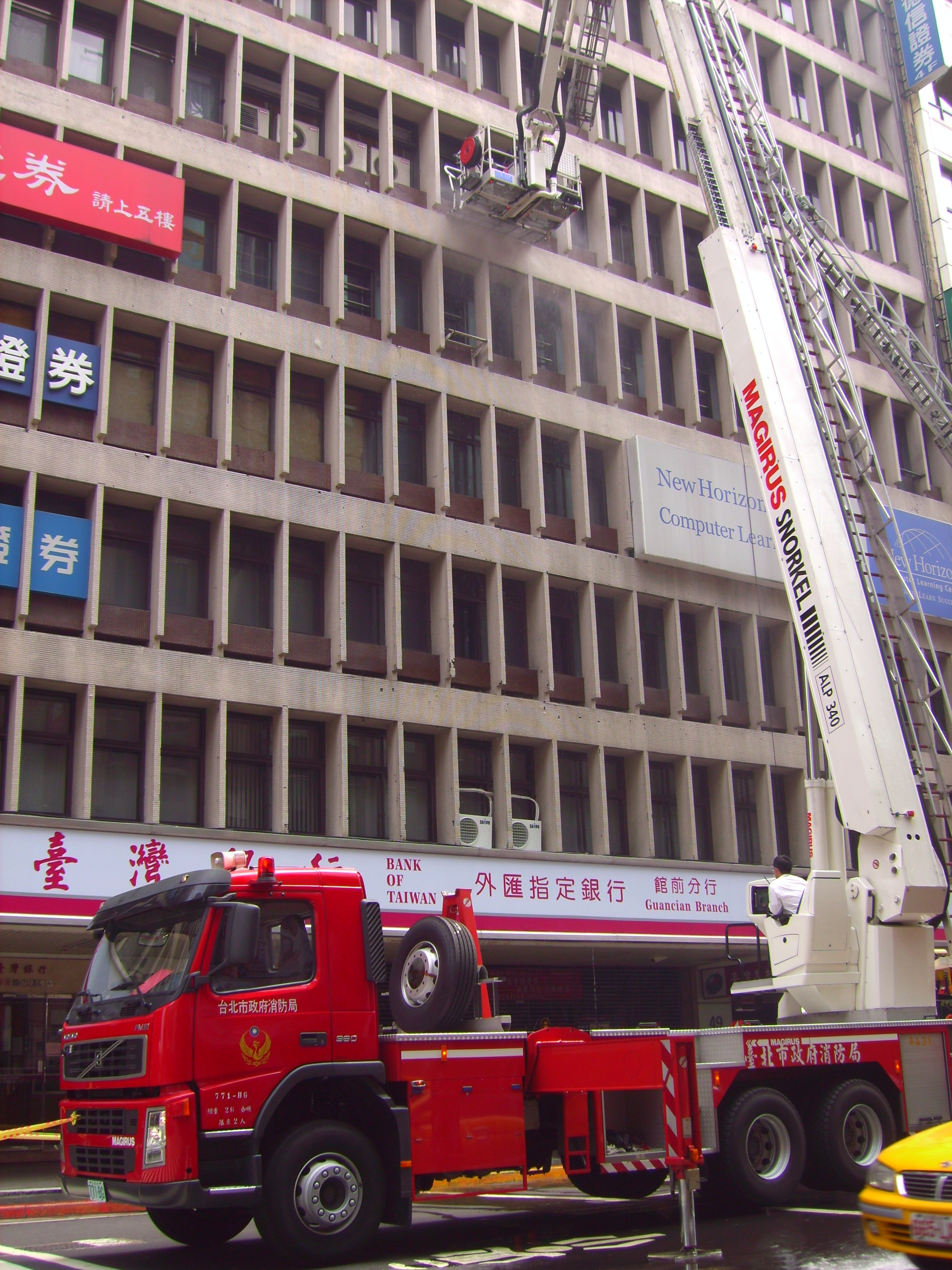
Volvo Magirus fire engine

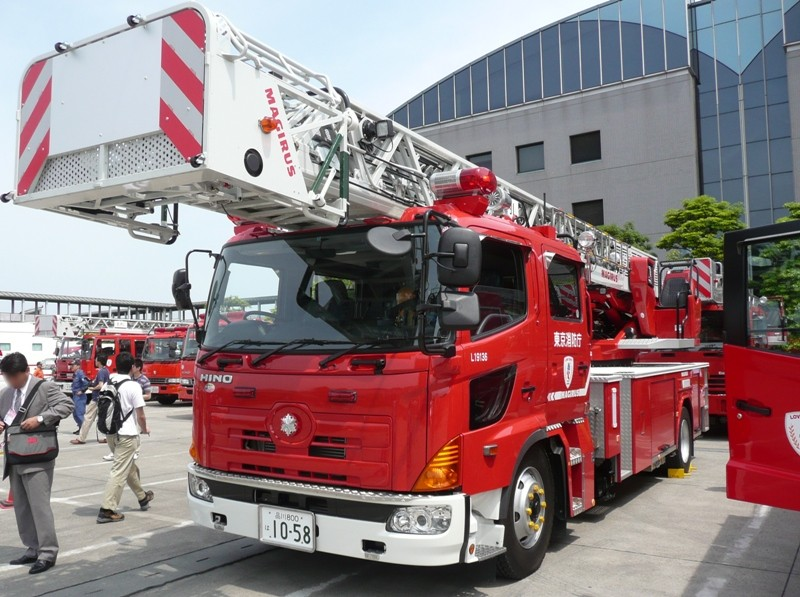
Japanese Fire Service Hino Motors Magirus fire engine

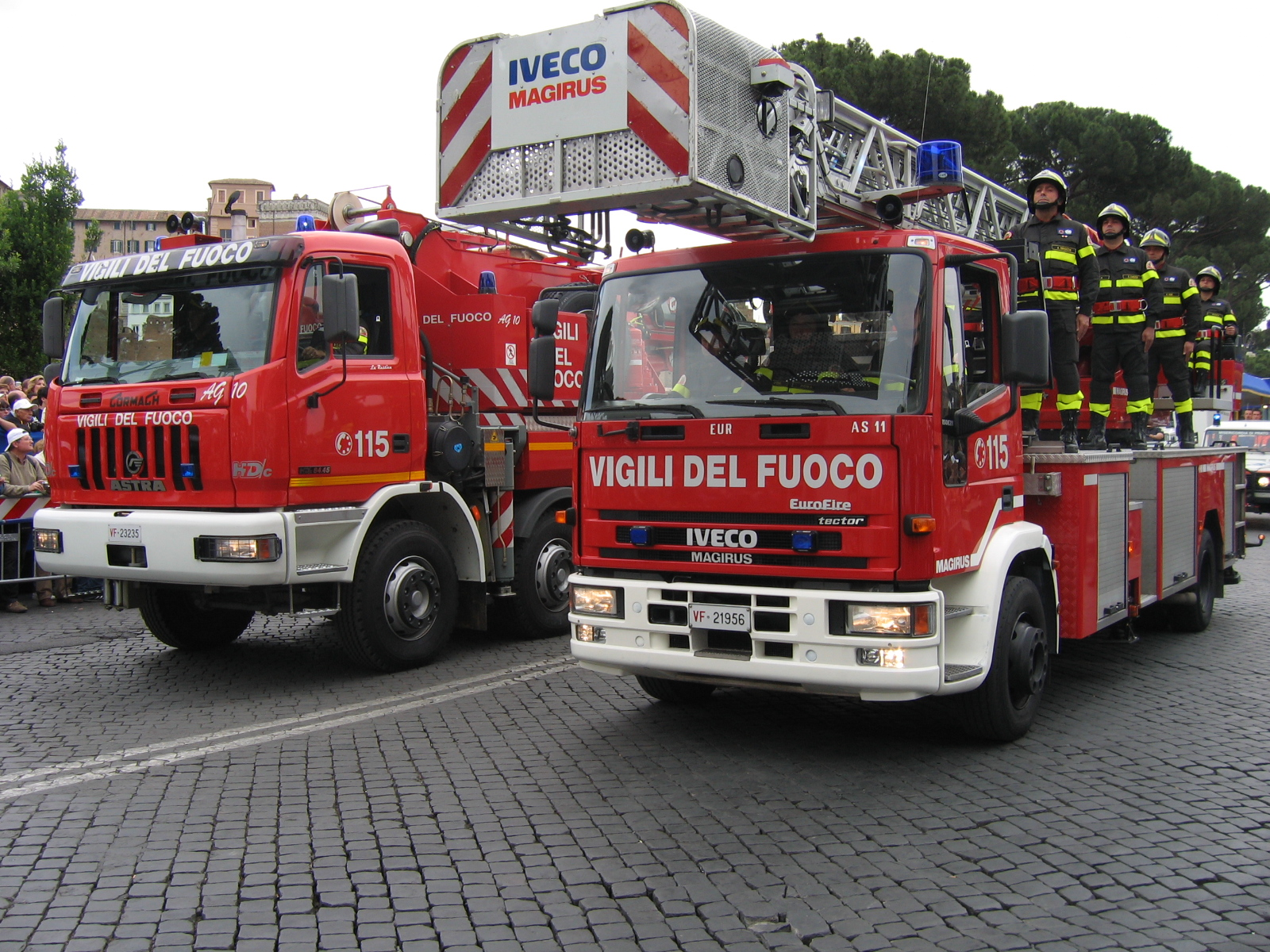
Italian Fire Service vehicles with an Astra crane on the left and a Magirus turntable ladder on the right, Army Parade in Rome, 2 June 2006

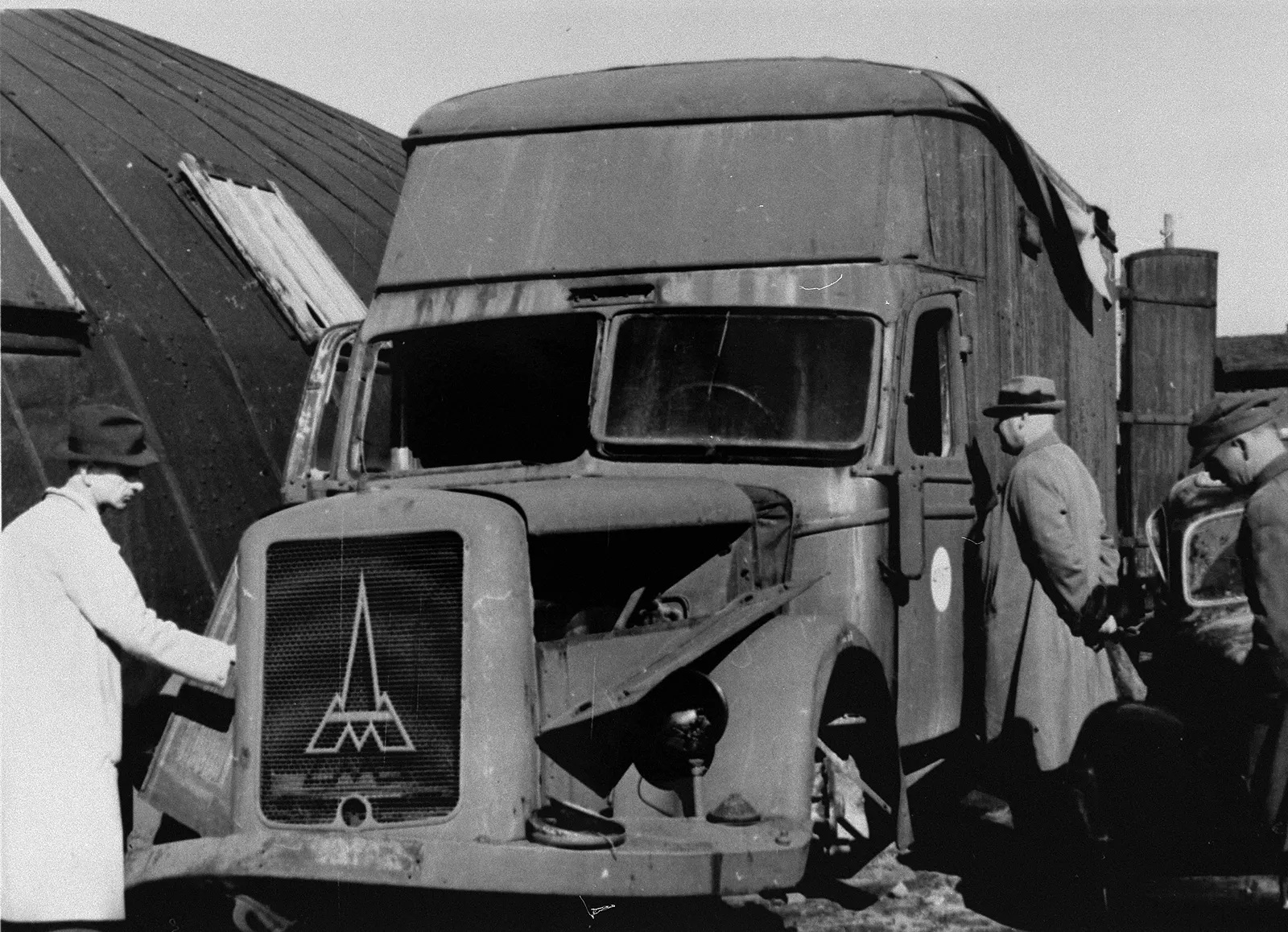
Magirus-Deutz truck - Chelmo Gas Van used for killing hundreds of thousands of Jews during World War 2

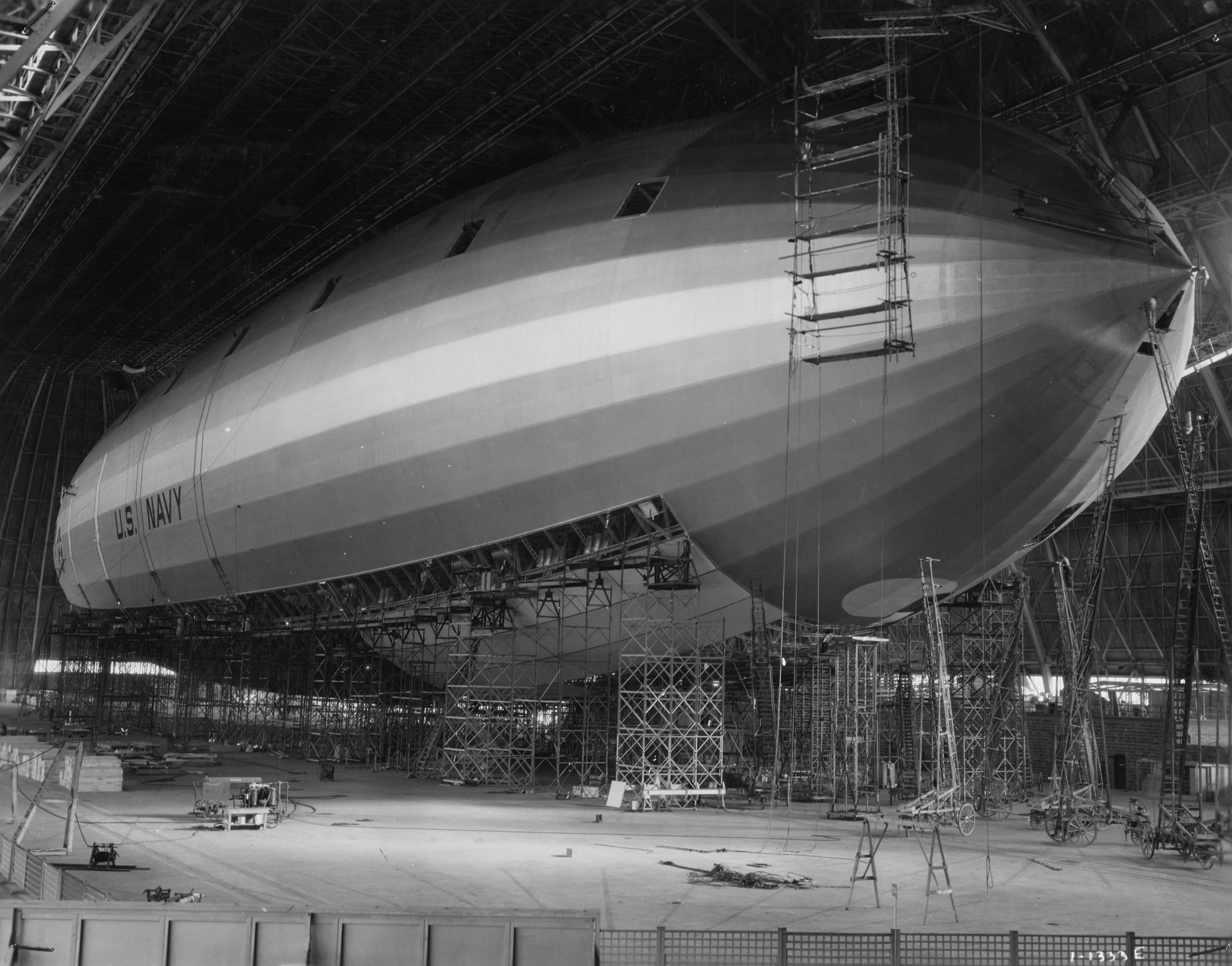
Magirus ladder on floor at front of USS Macon

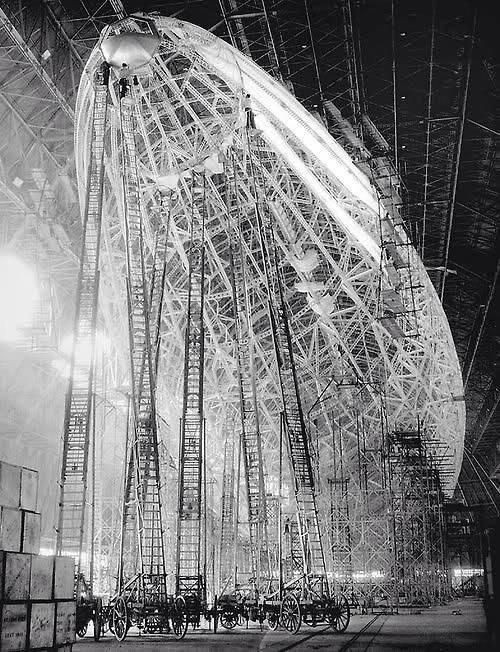
Several Magirus ladders in use on the construction of a rigid airship. (Notice men at the very top of several ladders.)

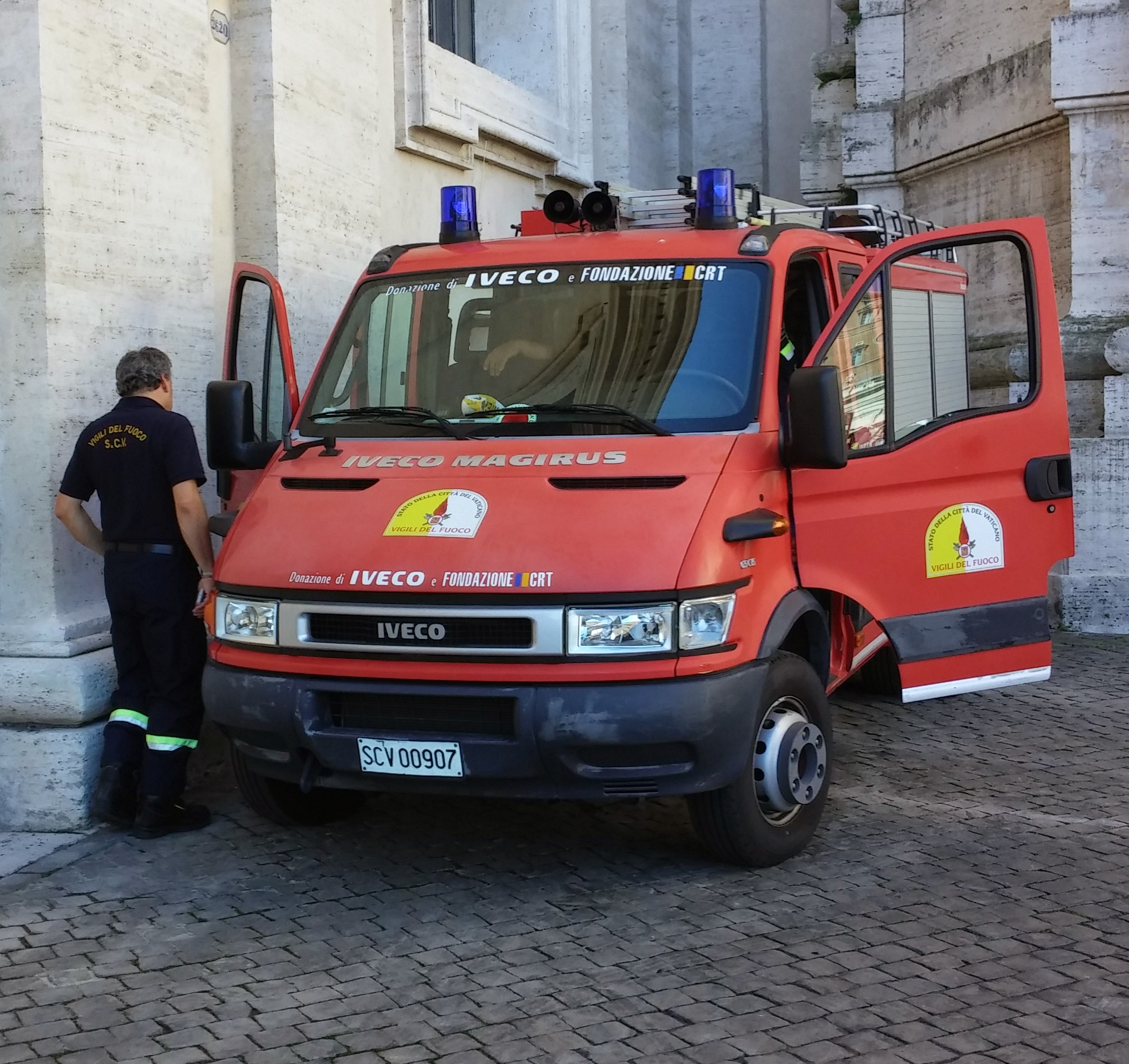
An IVECO Magirus Daily 65C15 van of the Vatican fire brigade.

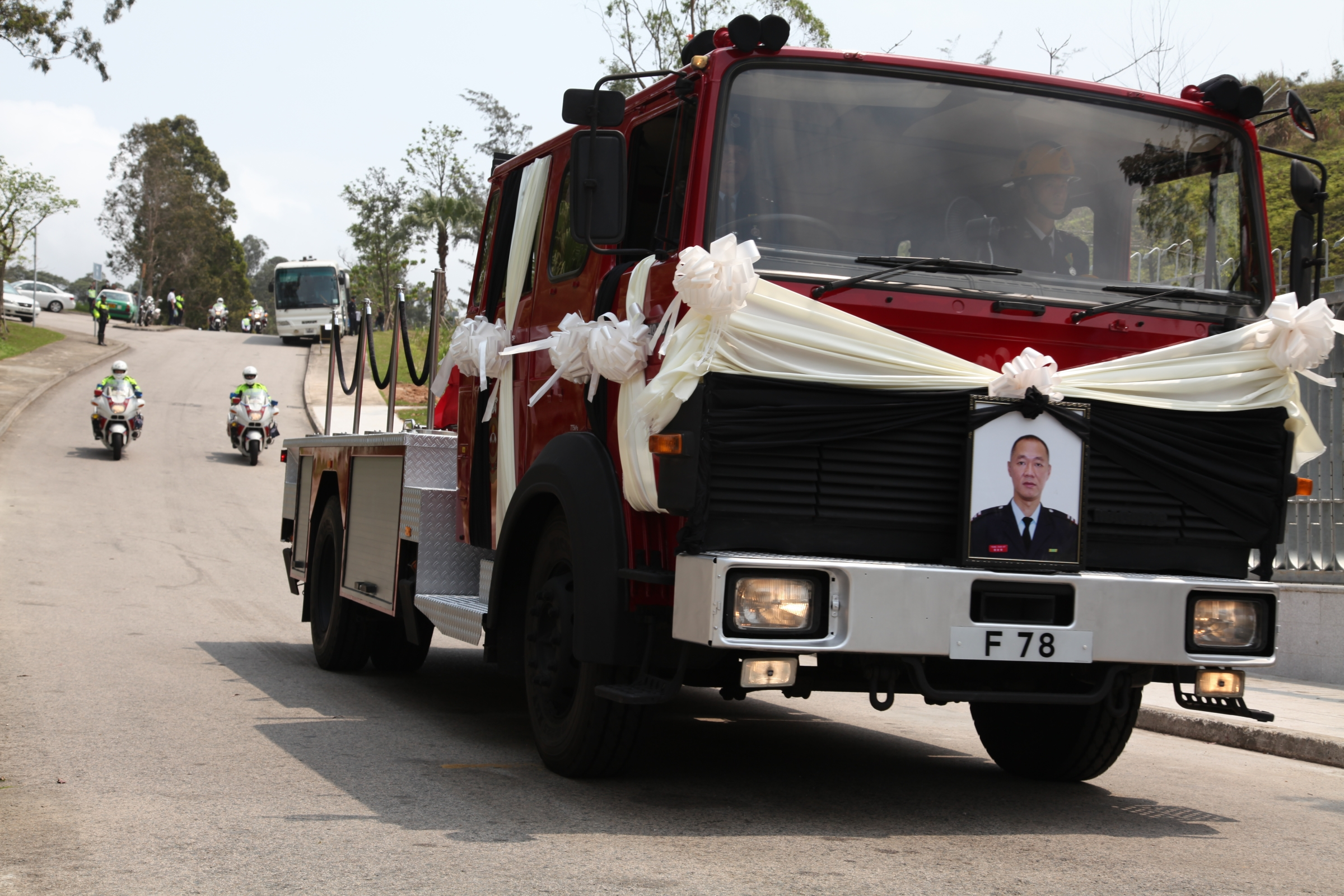
A retired IVECO 140-25 turntable ladder from Hong Kong Fire Services Department

== Timeline ==
1864 - Founded by Conrad Dietrich Magirus
1872 - 1872 2-wheel hand ladder climbable when free-standing, model »Ulmer Ladder«
1892 - First horse-pulled rotating ladder 25 m
1904 - First steam powered self-propelled “fire engine”
1916 - First fully automatic drive turn table ladder in the world
1917 - Production of Magirus motor vehicles
1931 - First turn table ladder with steel ladder set
1936 - Fusion with Humboldt-Deutz Motorenfabrik
1951 - Made the highest turntable ladder in the world 52 m
1953 - First turntable ladder with hydraulic drive
1965 - First forward control truck chassis
1971 - First rescue vehicle RW-rail for subway and local railway operation
1972 - First large airport crash tender
1980 - First turntable ladder »low-design«
1986 - First computer controlled turntable ladder
1987 - Take over of previous Bachert production plant in Weisweil, Germany
1992 - Iveco Mezzi Speciali, Brescia, Italy
1994 - First articulated ladder DLK 23-12 GL CC
1996 - Production start of light pumper vehicles in Görlitz/Germany
1997 - Lohr-Magirus in Graz/Austria
2000 - First oscillation-free turntable ladder (Computer Stabilized)
2005 - „Firework of Novelties“ at the Interschutz in Hannover
2007 - New modular bodywork generation AluFire 3
2010 - Presentation of the models M 32 L-AT, M 33 P, SuperDragon 2, MultiStar2 at the Interschutz in Leipzig
2015 - World's highest turntable ladder, 68 meters

== See also ==
- Fiat S.p.A.
- Iveco Bus
- Iveco S.p.A.
- Fiat Industrial S.p.A.
- Magirus Mercur
