= Magirus Mercur =

German truck

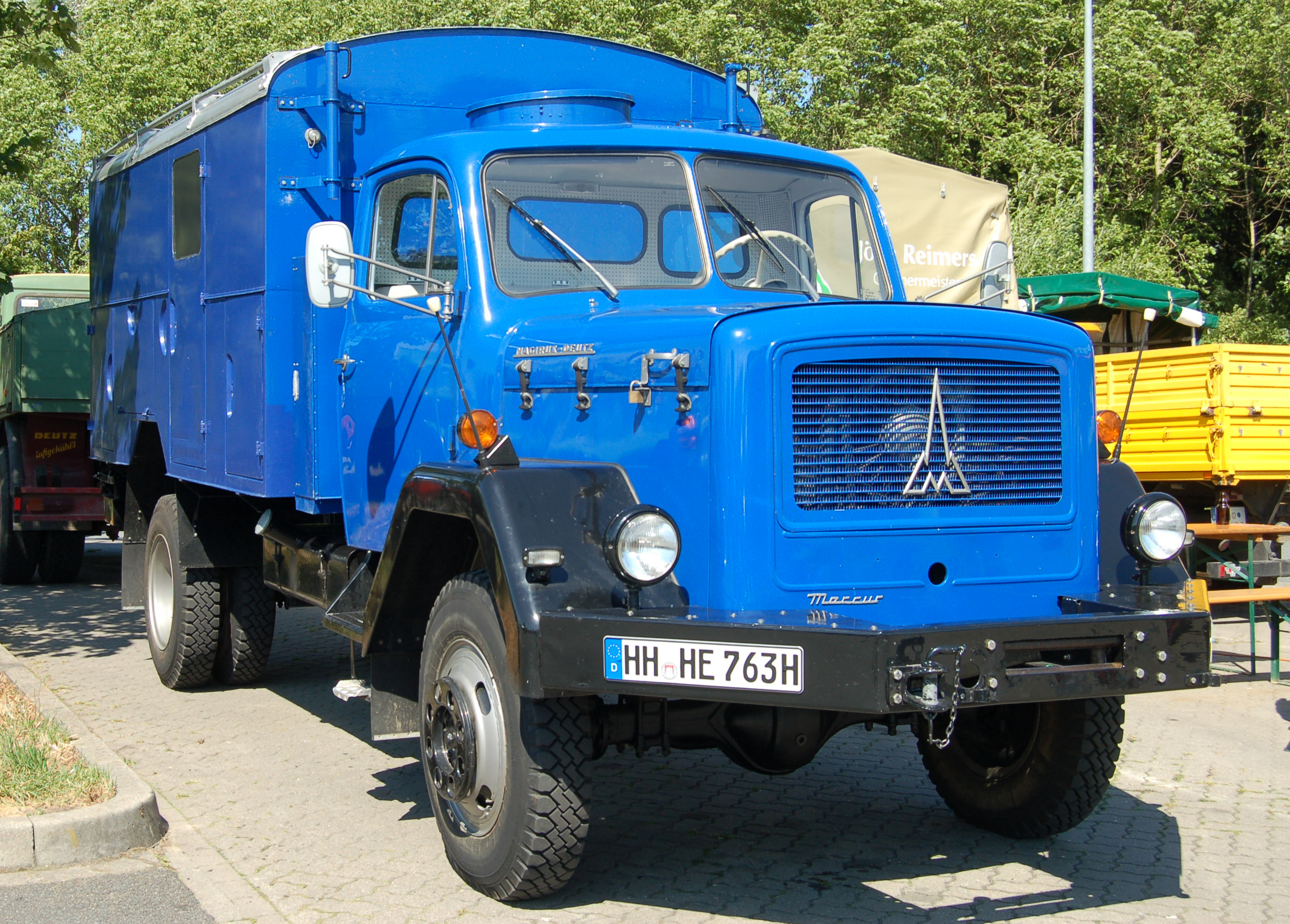
Magirus Mercur (model year unknown)

The Magirus Mercur is a German 5 ton truck built by Magirus Deutz in Germany from 1951 to 1972. Other series from this manufacturer were also named after stars and planets, possibly because of the "sun and planet" gears at the rear axle. Increasingly heavy trucks were named Sirius, Mercur, Saturn, Jupiter, Pluto and Uranus. The trucks were equipped with different variations of air cooled Diesel engines, from 4R to V12. The initially round hood ("Rundhauber") that inspired from the Volkswagen Beetle was eventually changed to a square design ("Eckhauber") in all wheel drive models to facilitate body flexing off road. The round hood was ultimately discontinued..

== Specifications ==
In 1964 the "Mercur 125 (A)" and Mercur 150 (A)" models were re-branded as 125 D 10 (A) and 150 D 10 (A). The numbers 125 and 150 referred to the horse power rating of the V6 engines; the 10 to the total gross weight of the vehicle. An optional designation was "A" for "Allrad" (All Wheel Drive). A forward control option was available. After a transition period, the Mercur was replaced by the mostly forward control 170 series in 1972.

A typical configuration of the Mercur as a fire truck was with a 600 gallon per minute pump inside the shelter that was powered by the truck engine. Another smaller pump (200 gallons per minute) could be carried (400 lbs) and was powered by a 34 hp Volkswagen Beetle engine (air cooled as well). Tankers were equipped with a 630 gallon water tank and did generally not have the carry-on pump.

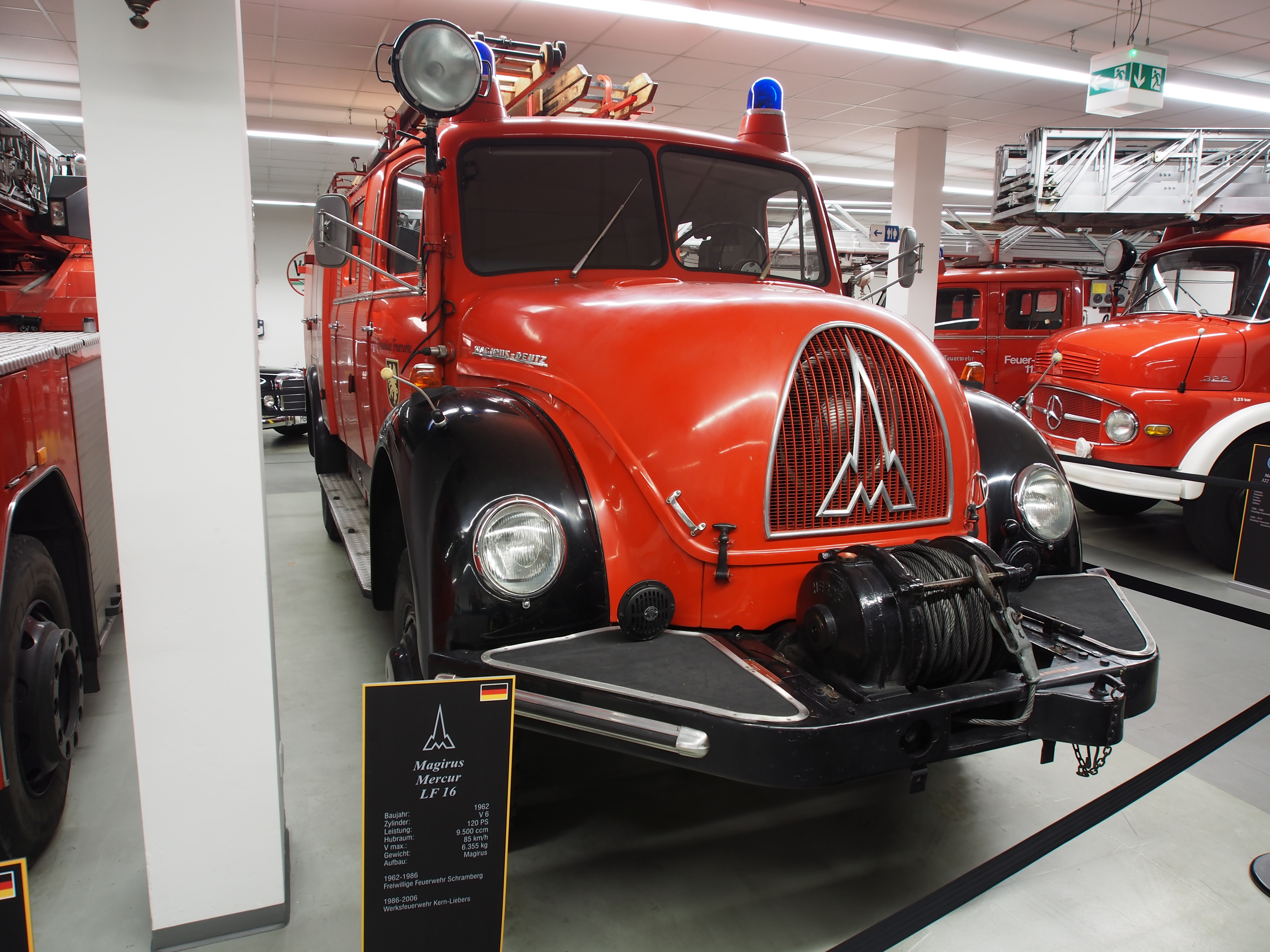
Early design Magirus Mercur four wheel drive pumper with round hood as used in many German fire departments in the late 1950s

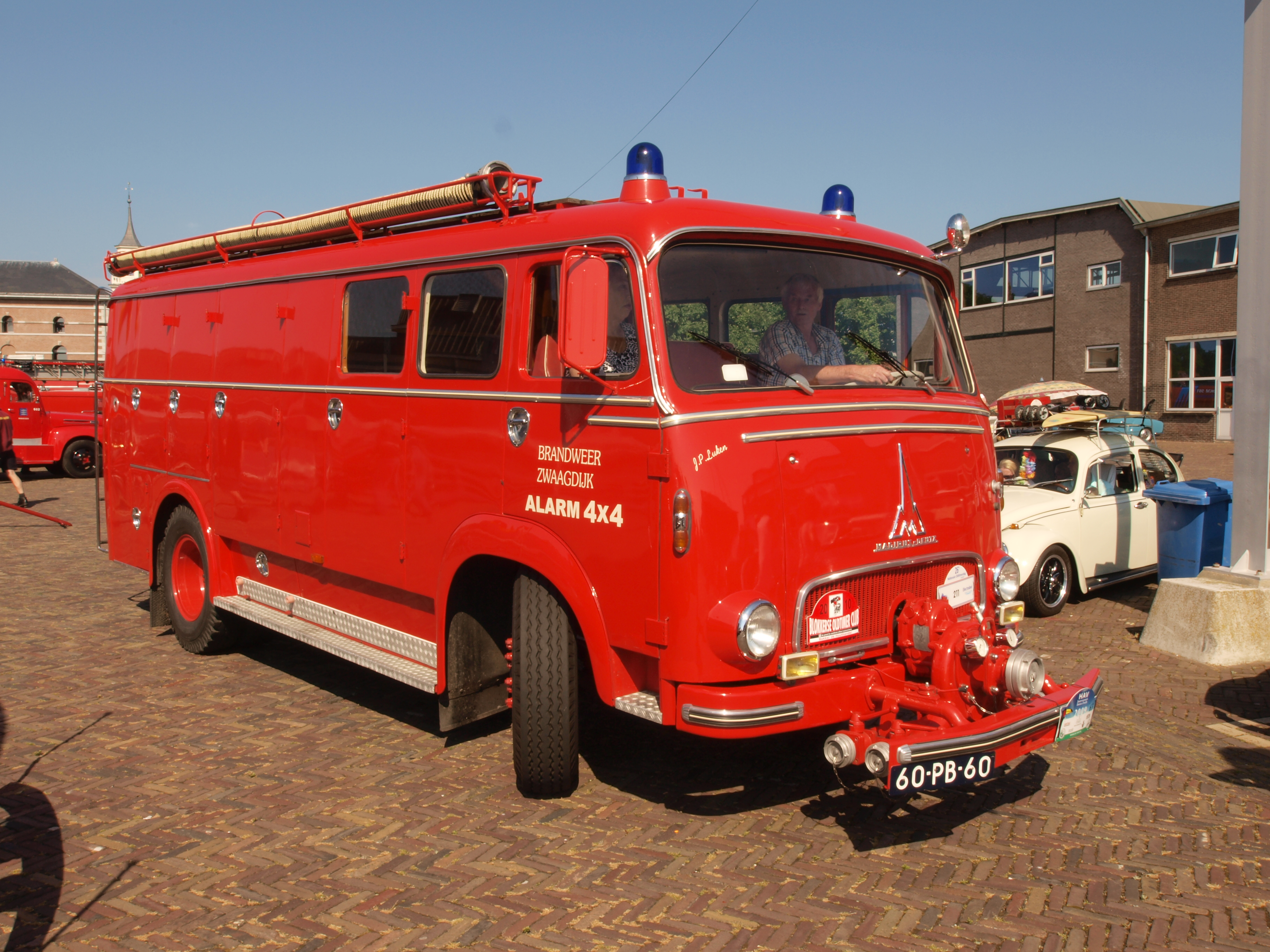
Rare forward control Magirus Mercur engine as used by a Dutch fire department

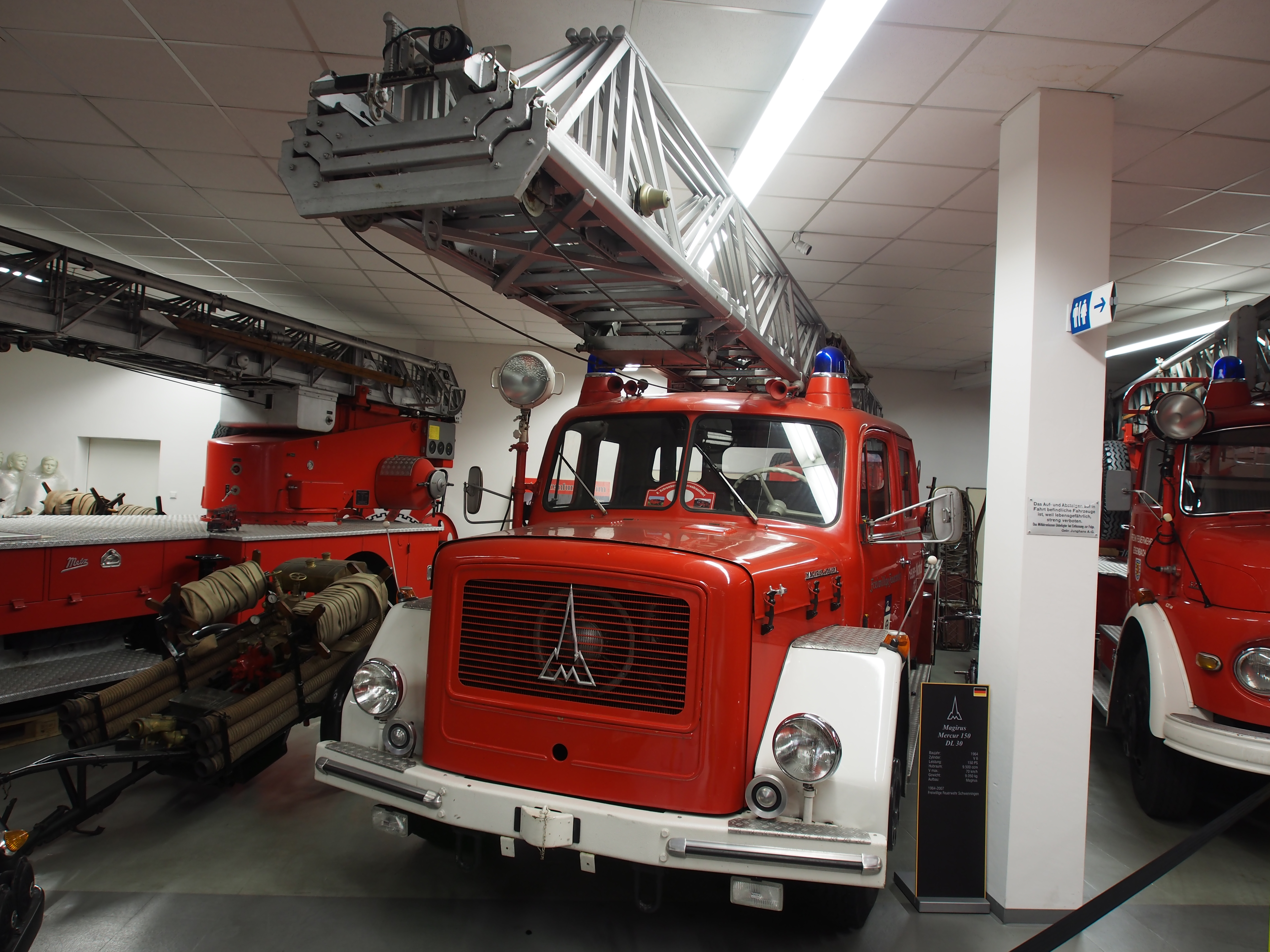
Late design square hood 150DL30 as a turntable ladder truck on a rear wheel drive chassis.

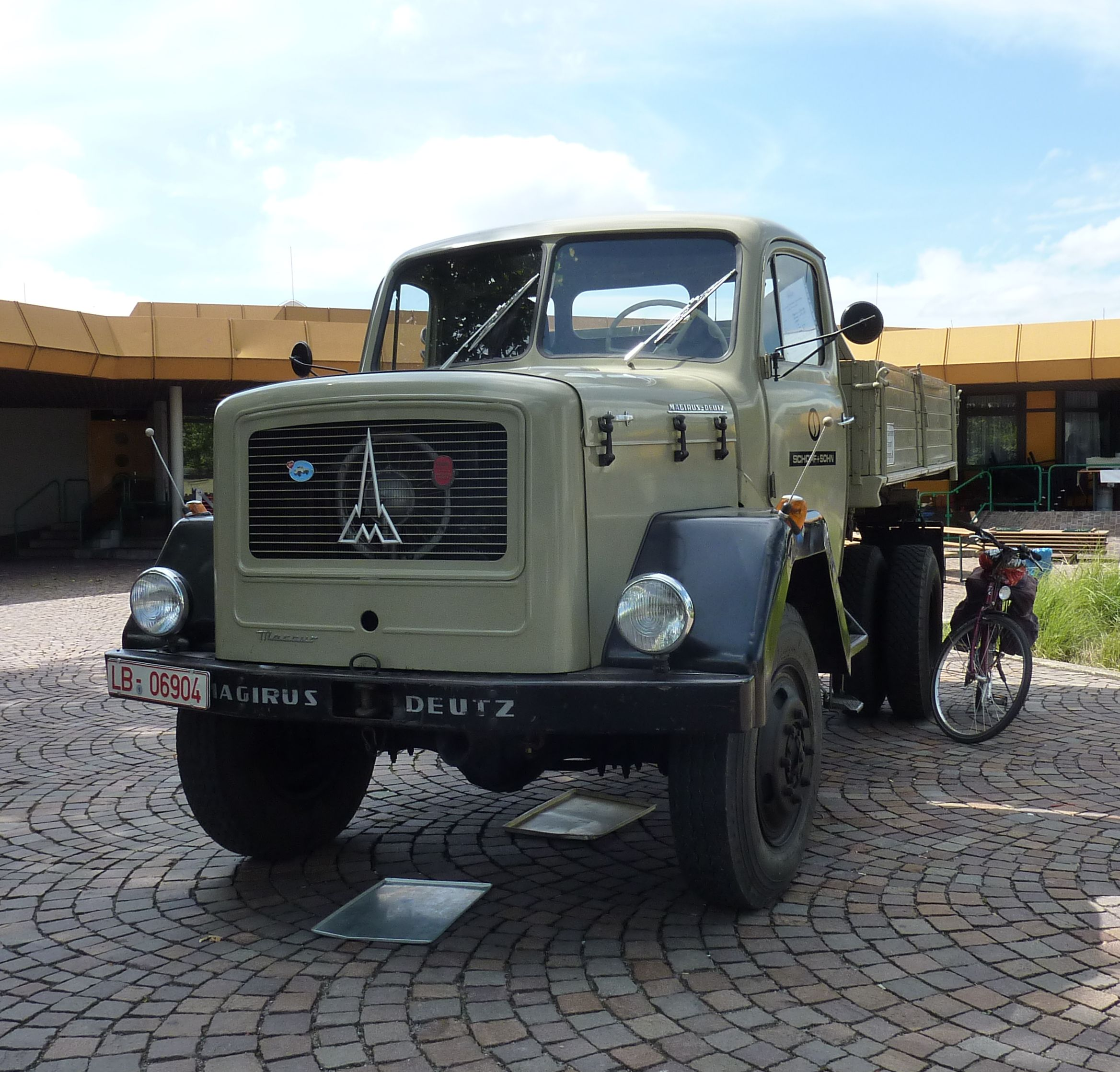
Four wheel drive Magirus Mercur dump truck

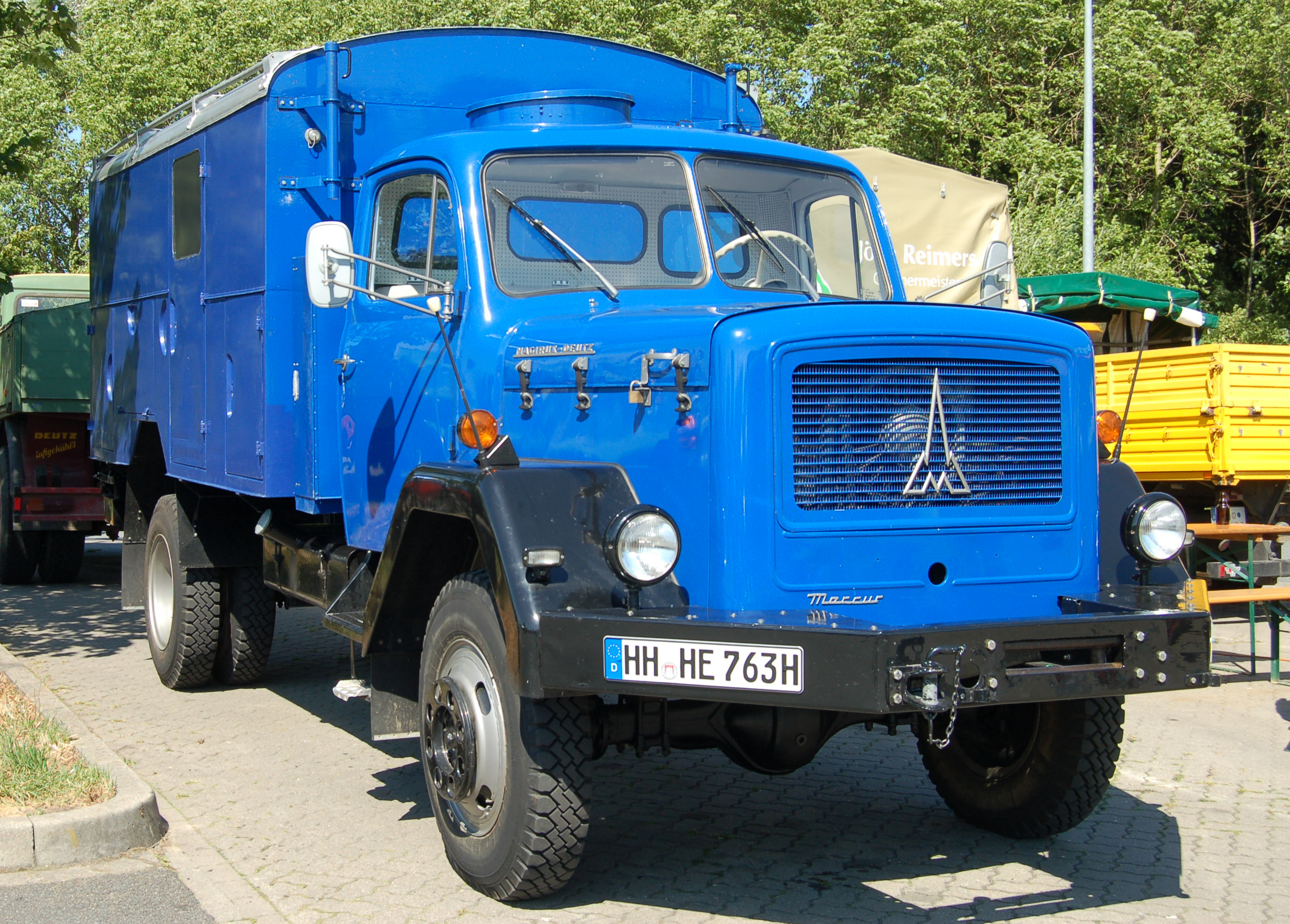
Magirus Mercur with a NATO shelter. This configuration and color was typically used by the "Technische Hilfswerk", part of the German disaster response system

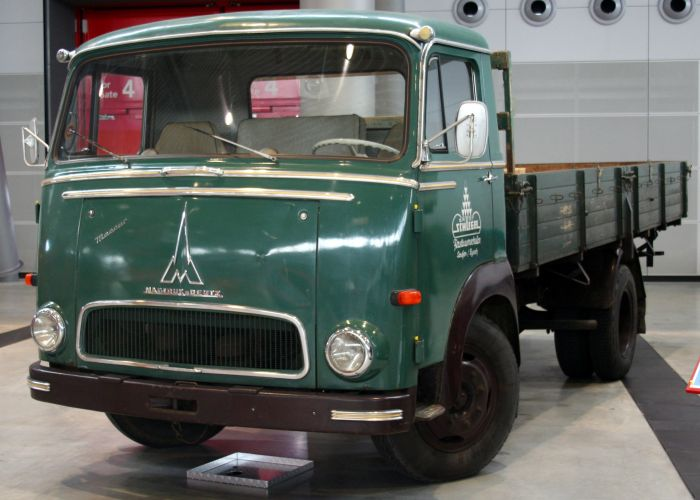
Magirus Mercur forward control dump truck

There were many different civilian and military options available.

The Mercur is equipped with an air-cooled 7.5L V6 Diesel engine that delivers 125 hp at 2850 rpm. A 9.5L 150 hp version (2300 rpm) was an option. Top speed is between 45 and 55 mph with 8.25 R 20 or 12.00 R 20 tires, respectively. Gas mileage is about 10 mpg.

Thanks to its locking center differential, the Mercur trucks are capable off road vehicles, and many of these trucks were converted into motor homes after retirement from the fire departments.

== Other truck models ==
The Magirus Deutz trucks were very successful, especially as dump trucks in construction (referred to as "German Bulls", mostly Mercurs and Saturns). The Mercur model was widely used as a fire engine in German fire departments. The V8 "Jupiter" was often used as an airfield fire truck or a military crane. V12 Uranus models were mostly used as a crane or for towing tanks. The Jupiter and Uranus models were also used by the armed forces of several European governments (Germany, Belgium, Sweden, Denmark), and some 40+ years old Jupiter fire trucks are still being used by the German forces in Afghanistan today.

== Production in Yugoslavia ==
In Yugoslavia, this bonneted truck has produced by Slovenian manufacturer TAM, as "TAM-Deutz" (110T10 - medium duty and 170T14 - heavy duty). In 1980, in factory production in this country, it was replaced by new model - cabover truck "TAM B-Series" (130T11 - medium duty, 190T15 - heavy duty, 260T26 - super heavy duty and 331T17 - hyper heavy duty).
