= Barbara Kluntz =

German composer, music teacher and poet (1661–1730)

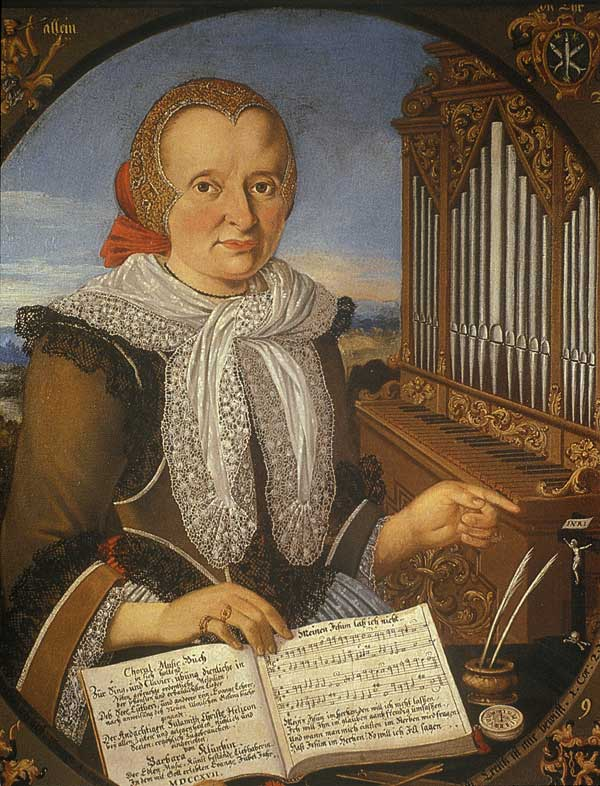
- Portrait of Kluntz, 1717
- Born: 5 February 1661; Ulm, Free Imperial City of Ulm, Holy Roman Empire
- Died: 22 May 1730 (burial date; aged 69); Ulm, Free Imperial City of Ulm, Holy Roman Empire
- Occupations: Composer; music teacher; poet
- Years active: 1704–1720s
- Era: Baroque
- Organization: Third Order of the Ulm Collection Women
- Musical career
- Genre: Classical
- Instruments: Piano; organ; clavichord

Barbara Kluntz (born 5 February 1661 in Ulm; buried 22 May 1730 in Ulm) was a German composer, music teacher and poet. On all of her book titles, she calls herself "Barbara Kluntz, Lover of the Noble Art of Music", in order to explicitly emphasize her position: she did not consider herself a professional musician.

== Biography ==
Barbara Kluntz, called "Schneiderbärbele", was the daughter and third child of the tailor Peter Kluntz and his wife Katharina Kluntz (née Messerschmid). She joined the charitable Third Order of the Ulm Collection Women who were evangelicals after the Reformation. The monastery-like association also owned several villages around Ulm and was located on Ulmer Frauenstrasse at the corner of Sammlungsgasse. The building was destroyed in World War II.

Because the women who entered the order did not have to take any vows, Kluntz was not a nun.

=== Entry into the Ulm Collection Foundation ===
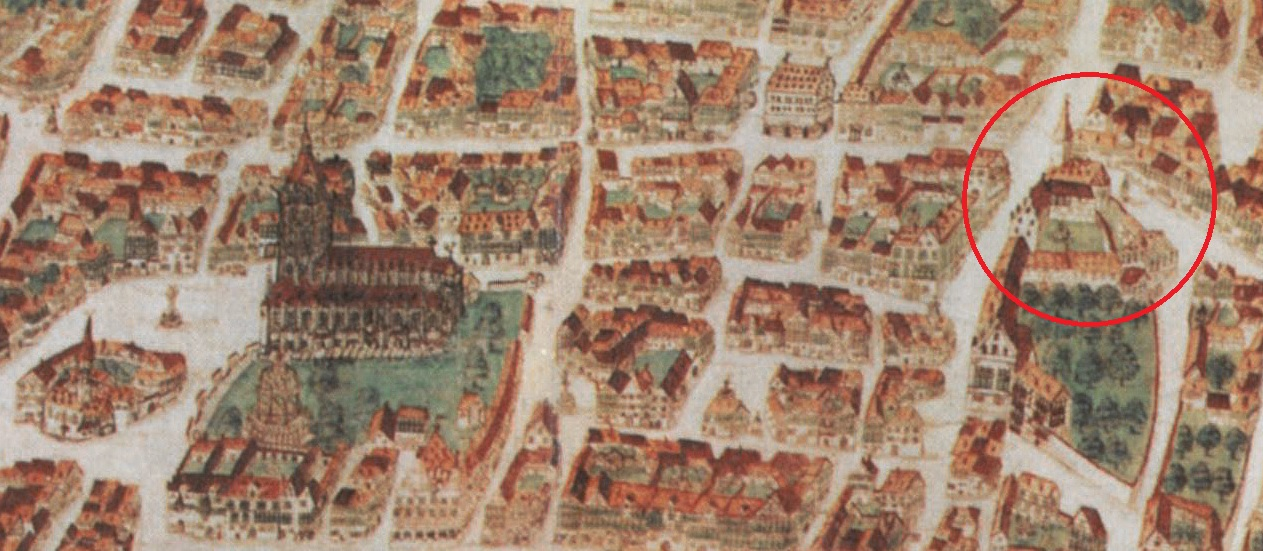
Location of the Ulm Collection; detail from the bird's eye view plan, 1597

When she entered the collection, Kluntz was widely known as a "piano virtuoso, organ player and poet", according to older research. Excerpts from her will, which no longer exists, show that she owned an organ, a clavichord, many books, and music.

How Kluntz came to her skills and what position her father had as a tailor within the Ulm tailors' guild is not yet known. Until then, only patrician women had been included in the collection. Why Kluntz only joined the collection at the age of 44 remains to be explored. Her musical activities can only be documented when she joined the collection in 1704. So far, no evidence can be found about her childhood, early and late adolescence.

Kluntz was not married; she moved into the collection under her maiden name and as a "maid". Her vocal and instrumental music making was probably dedicated to purely religious purposes. She also taught her colleagues, their students and many patrician daughters, in "clavier-playing". Her great role model was the French poet Georgette de Montenay, whose portrait she had included in her chorale book from 1711.

=== Contacts and concerts ===
Kluntz maintained contacts in Berlin through correspondence and probably had the latest musical works sent from there so that she could study and perform them. She likely accompanied herself and others herself on the clavichord and on the organ. Since the Ulm collection women were free to move around the city and in the monastery, it can be assumed that the Ulm Collection was a center of Ulm music practice alongside the permanently employed Ulm city performers and the emerging theater business.

=== Poetry ===
In addition to music, Barbara Kluntz also wrote many poems which she published in her chorale books, including a work that expresses her joy and vitality:

Deß Davids Harpff in Himel klingt,
wol dem, der mit mir frölich singt.
Lutherus singt uns allen vor,
Nach Gottes Wort führt den Tenor.
Wir singen nach und zwitzern mit,
Und Gott nimt an solch Lob und Bitt.
Wer nun Gott fürcht und hat mich gern
der singt mit mir zu Gott dem Herrn.

David's harp resounds in heaven;
blessed is he who sings joyfully with me.
Luther leads us all in song,
carrying the tenor in accord with God's Word.
We sing along and join the chorus,
and God accepts such praise and prayer.
Whoever fears God and loves me
sings with me to God the Lord.

(Choralbuch, 1711)

Kluntz also quoted the French poet Georgette de Montenay in her 1711 chorale book.

=== Choralbuch 1711 ===
The 245 chorales of the handwritten Choral Music book from 1711 are recorded only with title and partly without text. The melodies are set to chords with up to six voices, whereby the settings can suddenly switch between full voices and two-part passages. Occasionally, Kluntz also offers alternative suspensions to a chorale melody on the same page.

In her works, Kluntz often used fifths and octaves in parallel, and the third is just as often missing in the movements, despite four and five voices. This could be an indication that she learned her art auto-didactically, since the use of the third had long been common at this point in music history.

At the end of her first chorale book, Kluntz puts her happiest credo, her way of viewing music:

Ich waiß nit z'sagen, wie vil Gut,
In Musica ist verborgen;
Gott und Menschen sie g'fallen thut,
Music vertreibt die Sorgen,
Music verjagt die Traurigkeit,
Music den Geist erneüet,
Music macht Lust, und kürzt die Zeit,
und ewig uns erfreüet.
Music lieb' ich, so lang ich leb,
und frölich meine Stimm' erheb,
und sing: O Music! Himmels Kunst,
du bist wehrt aller Ehr' und Gunst.

I cannot say how much good
Is hidden within music;
It pleases both God and mankind,
Music dispels our cares,
Music drives away sadness,
Music renews the spirit,
Music brings joy and makes time fly,
And delights us forevermore.
I shall love music as long as I live,
And joyfully raise my voice to sing:
O Music! Art of the heavens,
You are worthy of all honor and favor.

(Choralbuch, 1711)

== Posthumous situation ==
It remains to be researched what happened to Kluntz's further legacy, such as the instruments and sheet music; a resolution of the city council of Ulm forbade the collection women to bequeath goods to one another in order to give them as little power and financial influence in the city as possible. Only a surviving excerpt from a (no longer preserved) artefact from the Ulm Collection Foundation, dated 10 December 1728, from the back of Kluntz's oil portrait, shows that she wrote a lost will at least two years before her death. Kluntz bequeathed her music (sheet music and clavichord) to the in-house chapel and decided that her organ should go to the Protestant church in Ersingen. However, after the Ulm collection was dissolved, the organ was (according to Ilse Schulz) taken to a "German school". Kluntz's music was probably destroyed in the Second World War by the bombing raids on Ulm, which destroyed the Ulm Collection.

=== Archives ===
Kluntz's grave is also considered lost. Only her two remaining chorale books and her oil portrait by an unknown artist are preserved. There are also two pages of her second, missing chorale book from 1717. Kluntz was portrayed in the typical collection uniform of that time. With her left hand, she points to a small cross; as she writes in almost all of her songs and poems, her music, which she holds in front of her as a chorale book, comes from God. Writing implements refer to her work as a poet and composer; a lemon in the foreground, which was a luxury item (shown in the original oil portrait, Museum Ulm), signifies a high status. Her own organ is likely in the background.

The diverse activities of Kluntz as a collector, music teacher, composer, organist, and pianist are unparalleled for the Ulm area and in general for her age.

== Works ==
- 3 chorale books from 1711, 1717 (lost) and 1720; with a total of more than 500 individual compositions of sacred songs, chants and arias (Stadtarchiv Ulm).
- General Bass Büchlein (c. 1720) – lost
- Laudet Jehova Te Ulma – Nine-strophic Latin hymn with the melody of "Nun alle Gott" as a hymn to Kluntz's hometown (Choralbuch 1711).
- Totenlied ('Funeral Song') by Anna Maria Reiser (collector) on the death of Barbara Kluntz, published by Daniel Ringmacher in a lost anthology.
- Portrait of Barbara Kluntz by an unknown artist (Museum Ulm, Inv. No. 1928.6048).
