= Conrad Dietrich Magirus =

German fire brigade pioneer and entrepreneur

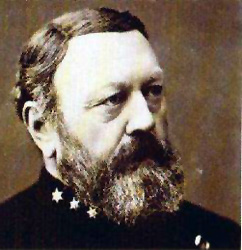
Conrad Dietrich Magirus

Conrad Dietrich Magirus (26 September 1824, Ulm – 26 June 1895, Ulm) was a German fire brigade pioneer and entrepreneur. He is credited with inventing the mobile fire ladder.

== Life and work ==
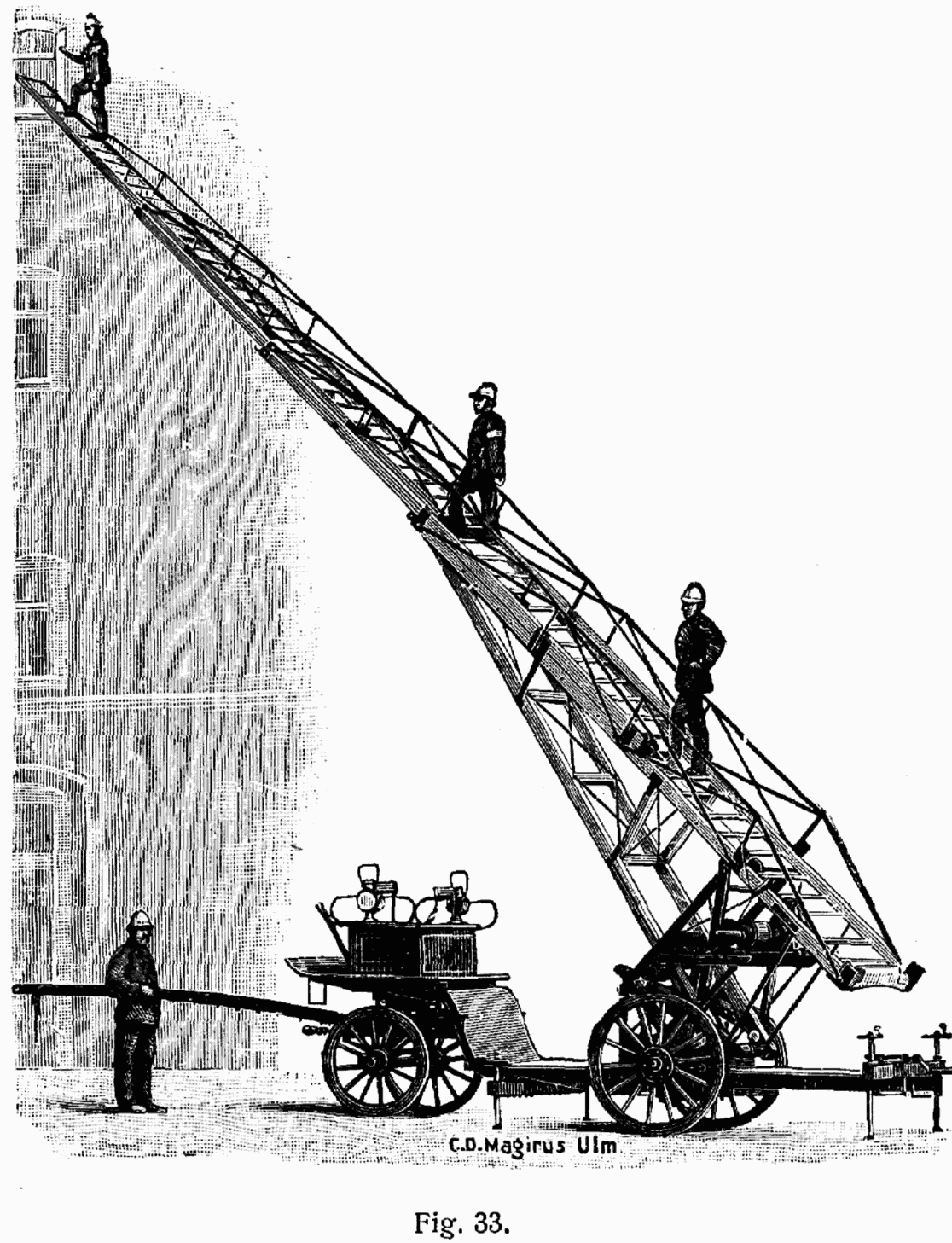
An early Magirus turntable ladder

Magirus was the son of a grocer and factory owner and pursued commercial studies in Naples. He later became director of the Ulm Gymnastic Society. In 1846, some of its members became Ulm's first official company of firefighters. In 1850, Magirus took over his father's business and published his history of firefighting techniques, Das Feuerlöschwesen in allen seinen Theilen.

Due to the success of his firefighting and fire safety efforts, he was appointed Commander of the Ulm Fire Brigade in 1853. On July 10 of that same year, he was the principal founder of the Deutscher Feuerwehrverband, an association of professional firefighters, which still exists. He soon put a second fire engine in operation and worked to improve the organization and technology of the fire-fighting process. His experience with the brigade eventually led him to the idea of mobile fire ladders. In 1864, he became a partner in the newly founded Eberhardt Brothers company, a manufacturer of firefighting equipment. In 1866, after a disagreement with the Eberhardts, Magirus founded his own fire equipment company.

In 1887, Magirus passed control of the company to his sons Heinrich, Otto and Hermann. He died in 1895. There are streets named after him in Ulm, Stuttgart and Berlin. In 1911, the company became "C. D. Magirus AG". This company later became "Magirus-Deutz" and, today, is part of Iveco Magirus.

An annual prize, named after Magirus, is awarded to the "Best Fire Brigade Team of the Year" in Germany.

=== Company highlights ===
- 1872: A free-standing, mountable two-wheel ladder was produced.
- 1892: The first turntable ladder, with a height of 25 meters, was placed on the market.
- 1903: The first self-propelled steam fire engine was built.
- 1904: The world's first turntable ladder with a fully automatic drive was introduced.
