= Ulm Sparrow =

Landmark in the city of Ulm

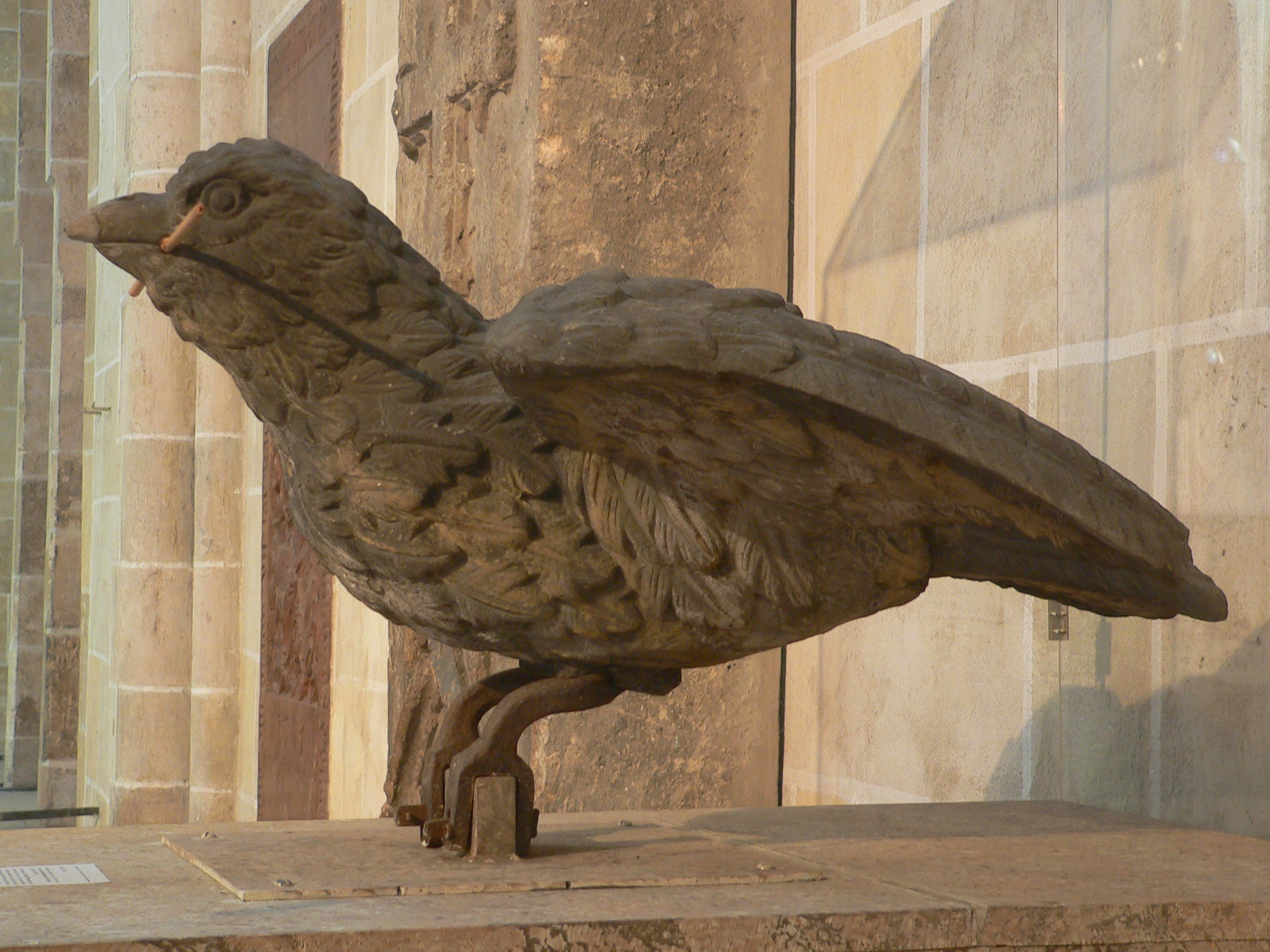
„Ulmer Spatz“: the original of 1858 by the cathedral roof is now in the Ulmer Münster near the entrance in a display case

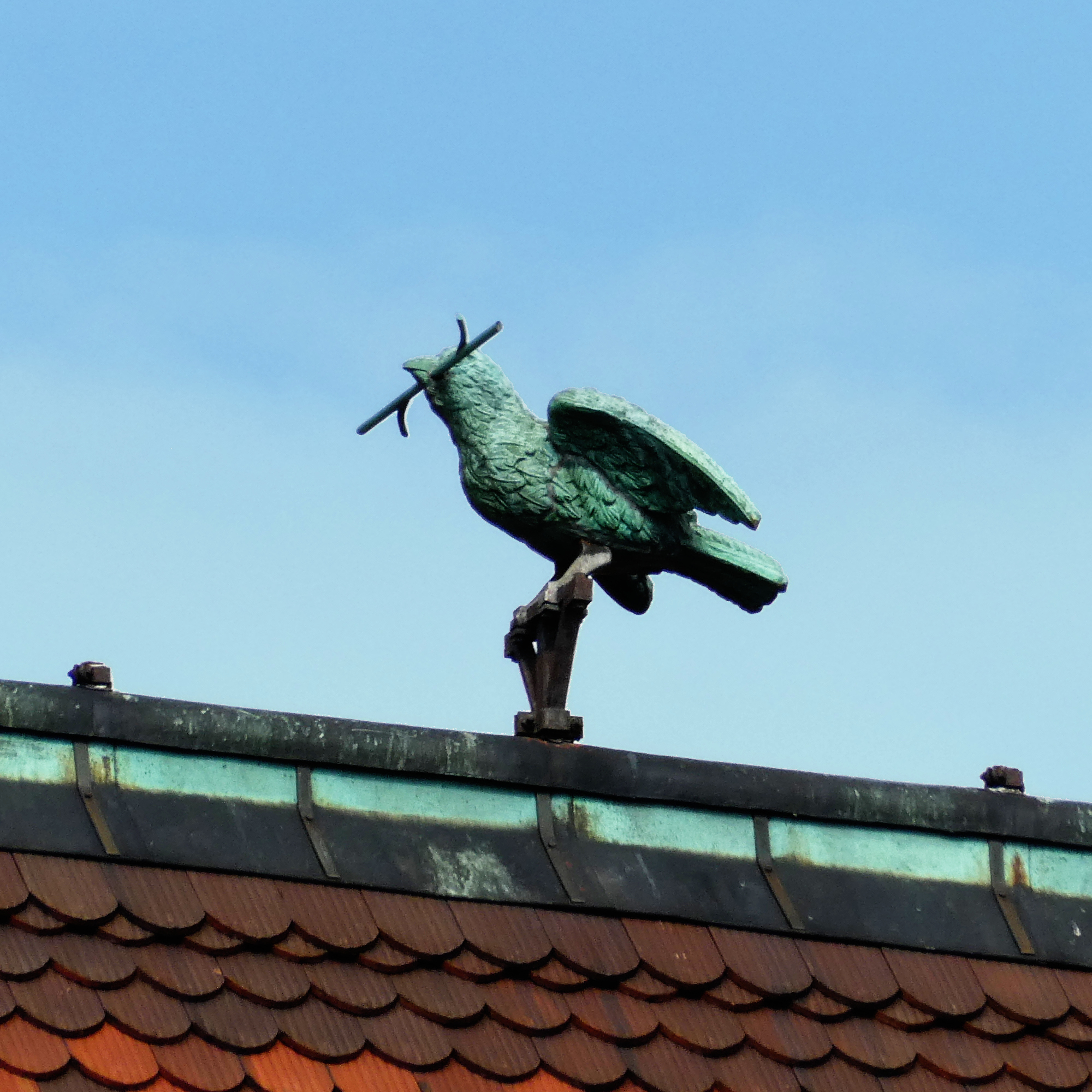
The copy at the minster roof

The Ulm Sparrow (Ger. Ulmer Spatz) is a landmark in, and symbol of, the German city of Ulm. The landmark is a statue of a bird that sits atop the Ulm Minster, the second-tallest church in the world.

== Legend ==
According to legend, the inhabitants of Ulm needed a particularly large beam for the construction of Ulm Minster, but could not get it through the city gate. As they were about to tear the gate down, they noticed a sparrow carrying a straw for its nest; which turned it from crosswise to lengthwise in its beak. A realization descended on the people of Ulm. Since that epiphany, they have placed long loads along rather than across their carts and were able to enter the city without rebuilding their gate.

The legend is first recorded in an 1842 poem by Carl Hertzog.

The figure on the nave of Ulm Minster was donated by wealthy citizens. It is not a sparrow, but a dove carrying an olive branch in its beak, as in the biblical story of Noah's Ark. It is small in relation to the building, and only easily visible from the tower. Due to its perceived size, the inhabitants came to refer to it mockingly as a sparrow, and the legend grew from there.

== Cultural references ==
- Ulmer Spatz is a nickname both for inhabitants of Ulm and for players in the sports club SSV Ulm 1846.
- Ulmer Spatz is a glazed bread roll, similar to a pretzel.
- A children's and youth's choir is named Die Ulmer Spatzen.
- A heritage train called Ulmer Spatz operates at weekends from Ulm through the Swabian Jura.
- A restored cruise ship on the Upper Danube is named Ulmer Spatz.
- Asteroid 8345 Ulmerspatz is named after the Ulm Sparrow.

== Gallery ==
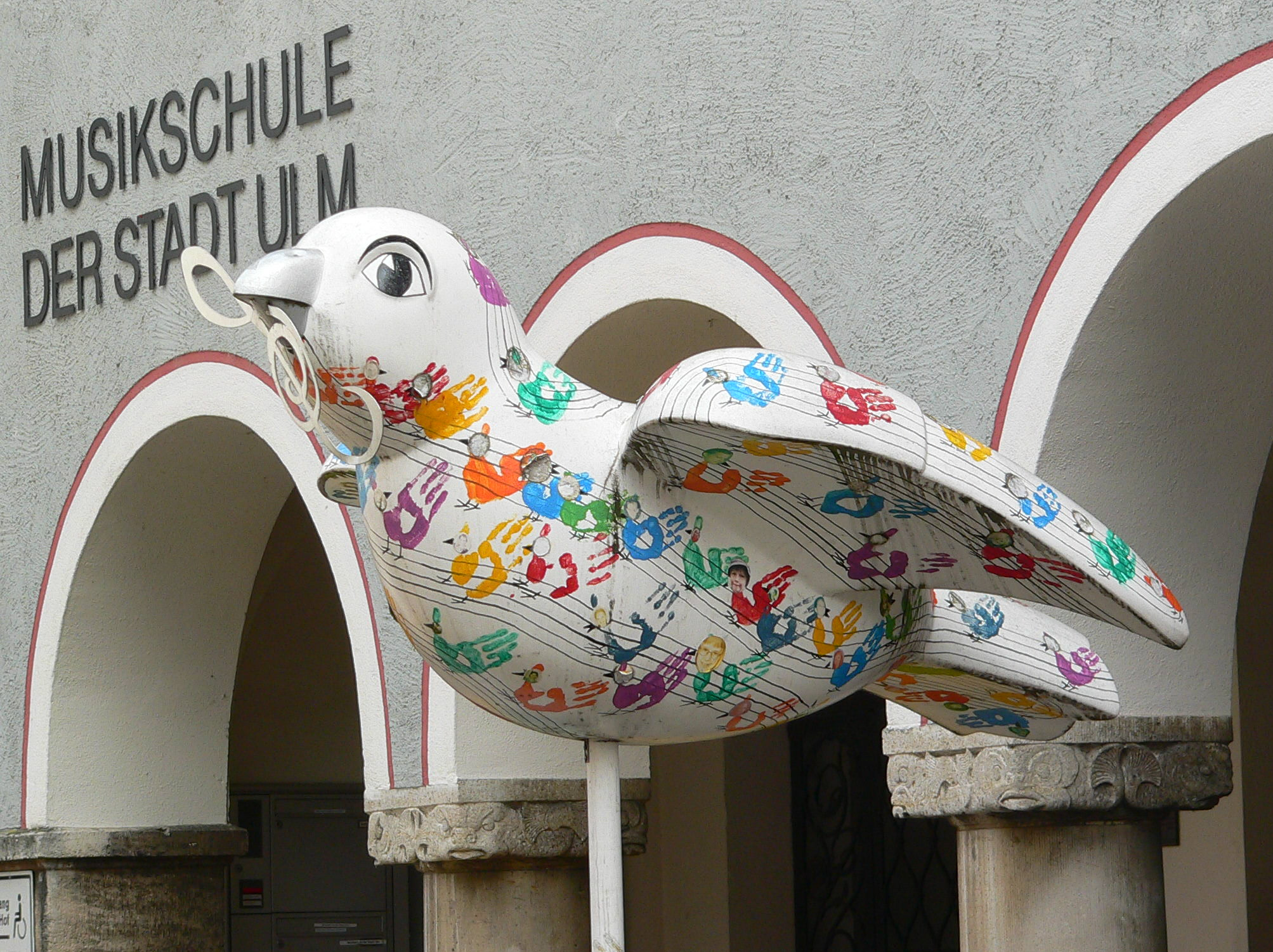
at the music school

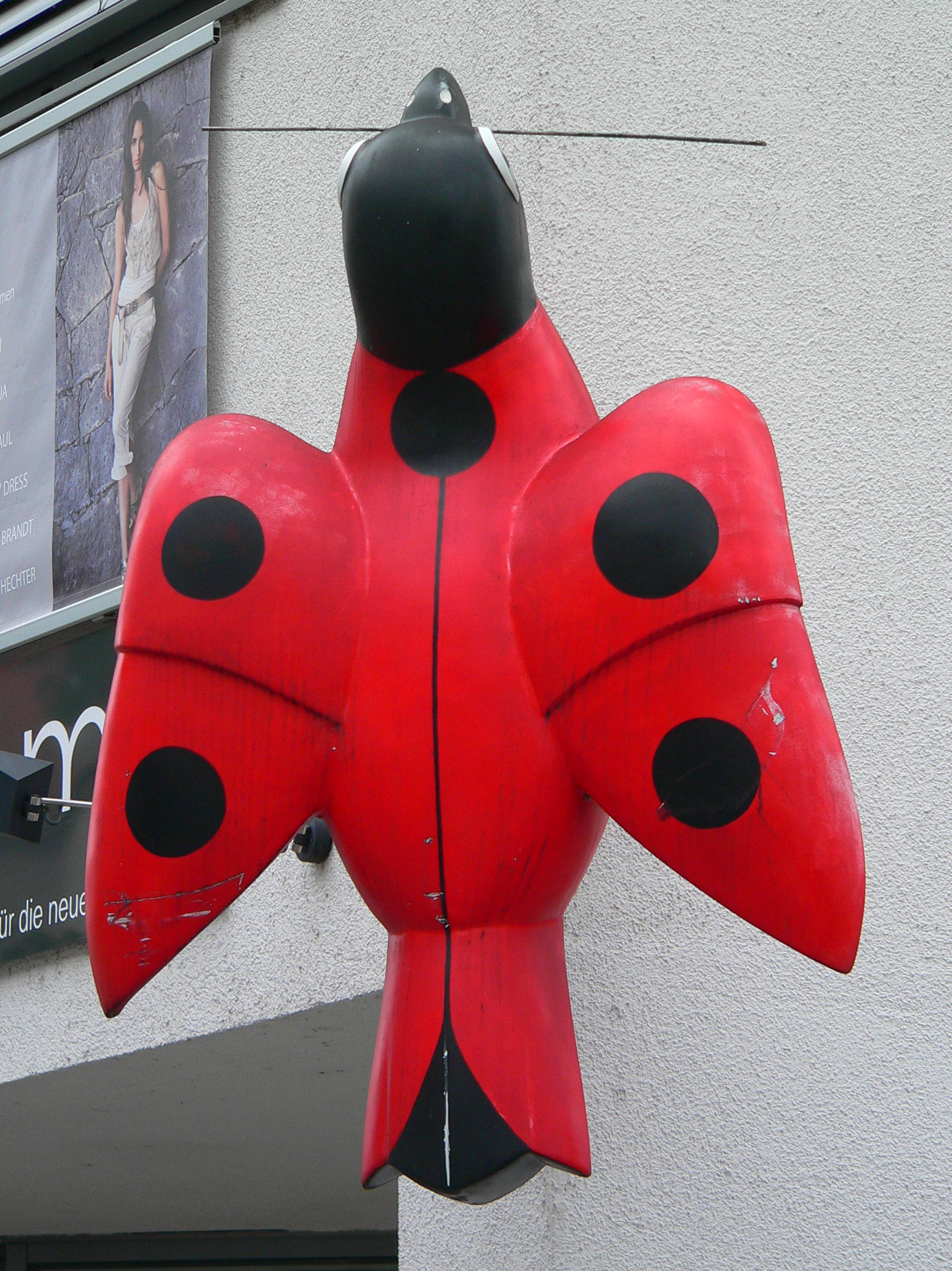
on a fashion shop

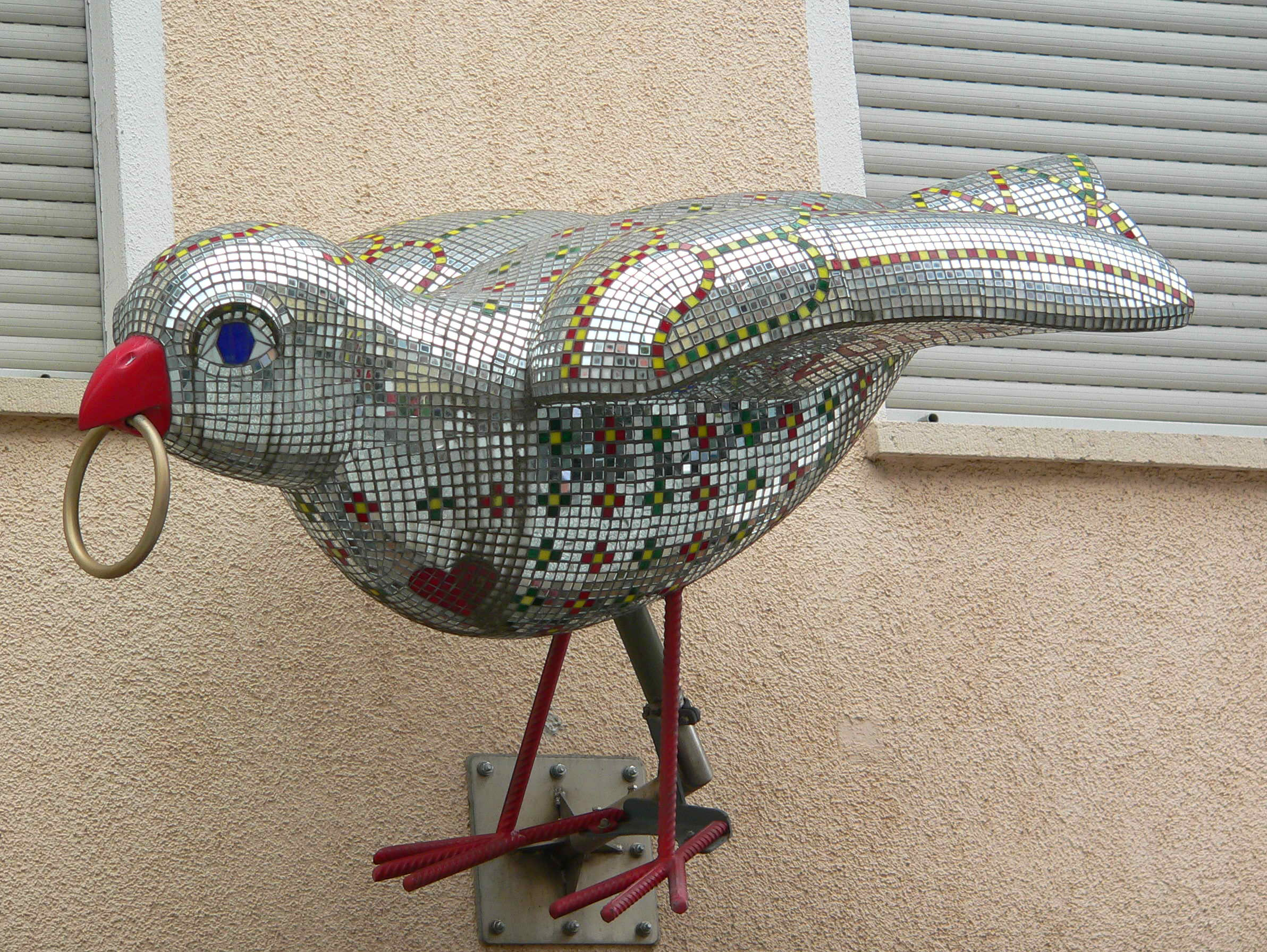
at a jewelry store

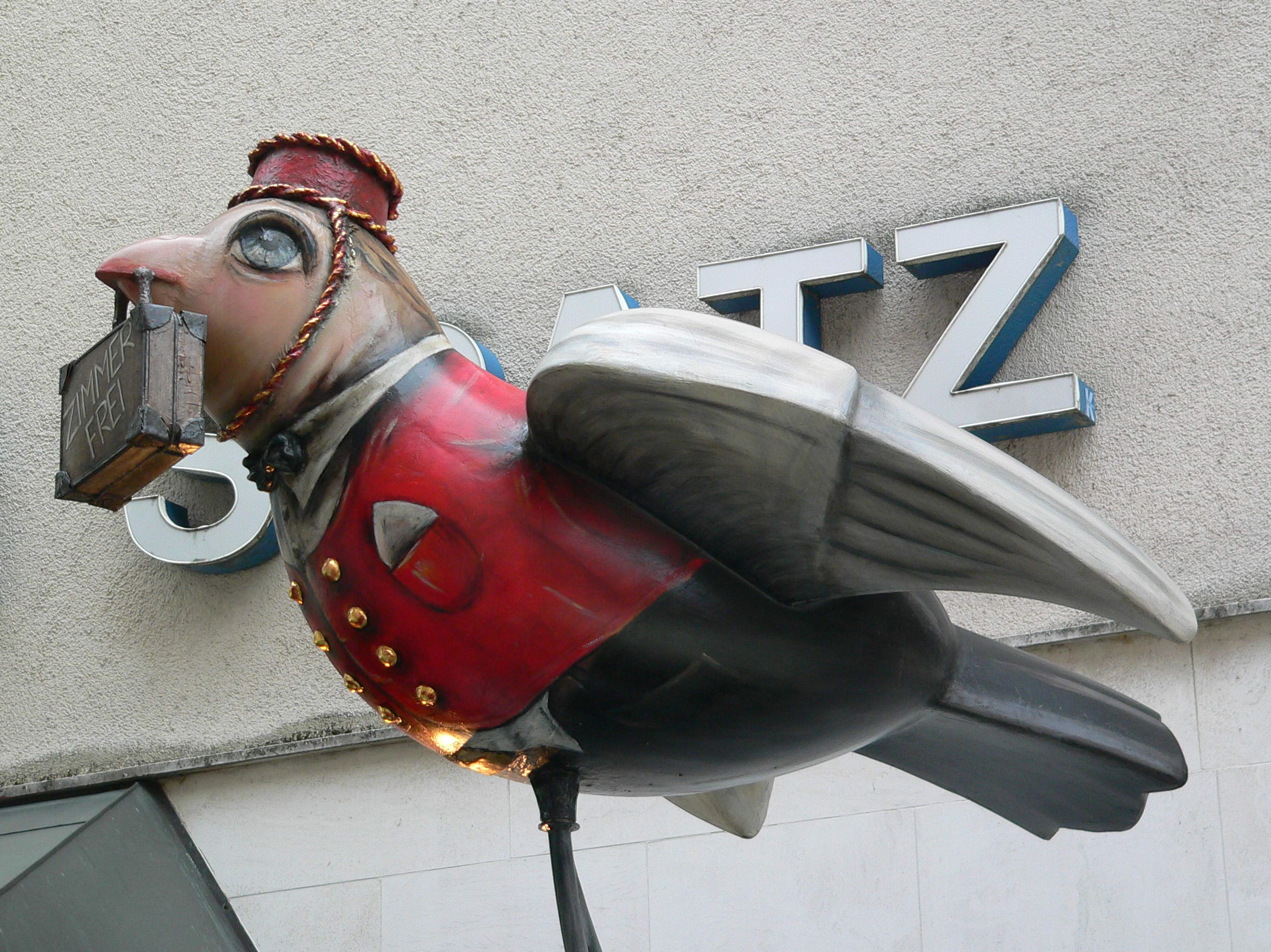
at the restaurant Ulmer Spatz

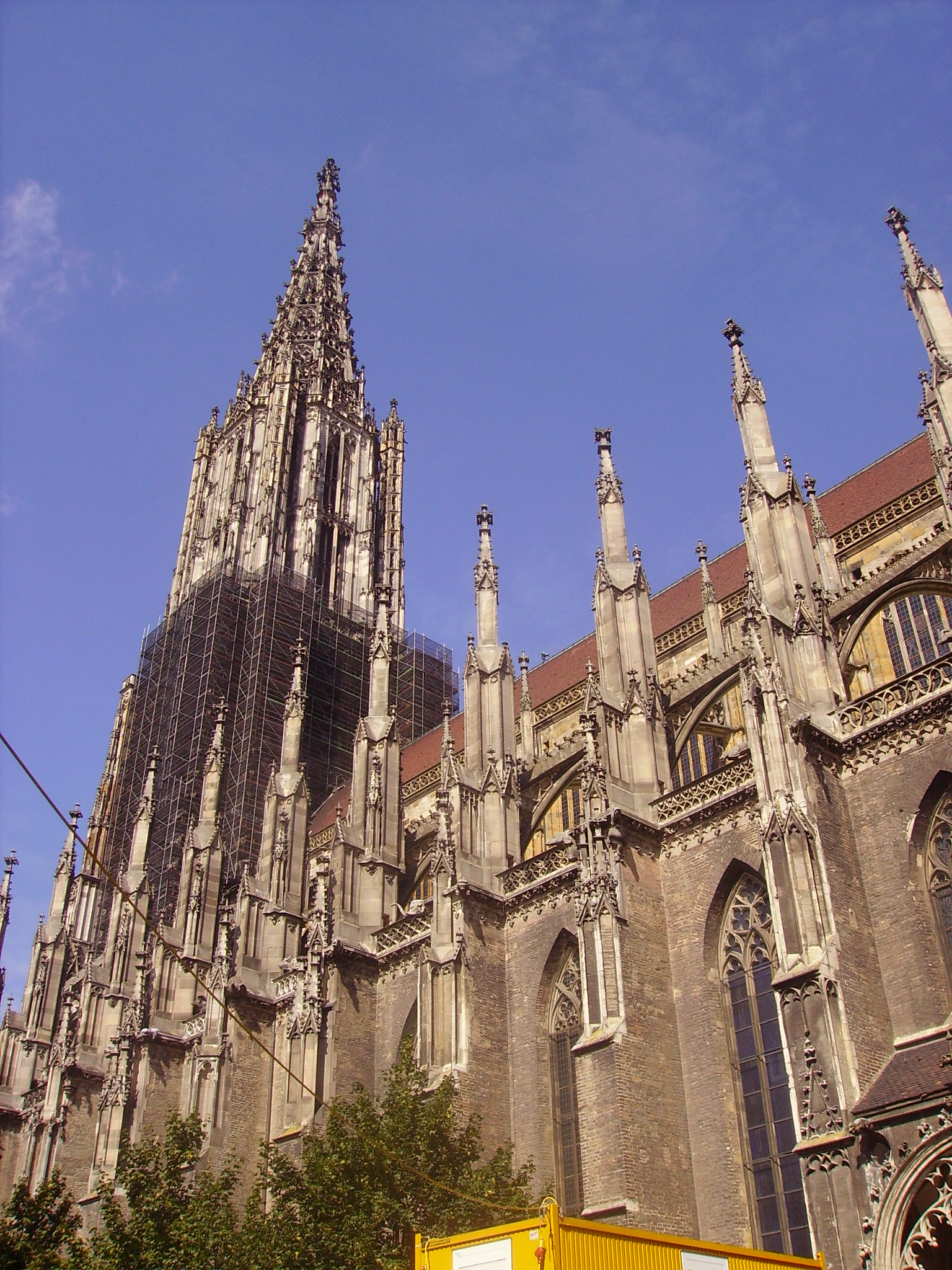
The sparrow on the roof (in the centre of the picture)
