= Květov =

- Municipality
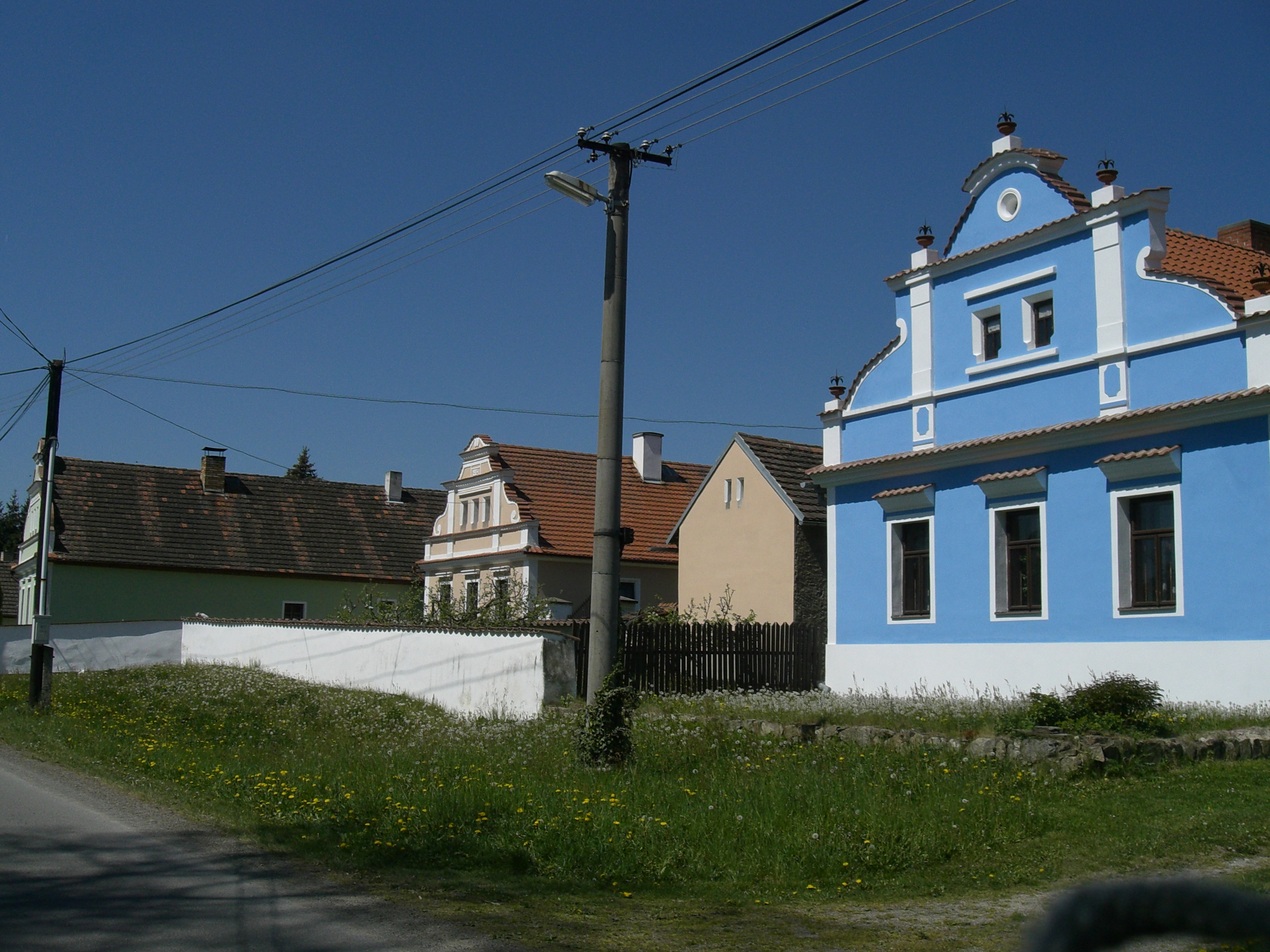
- Houses in the Folk Baroque style

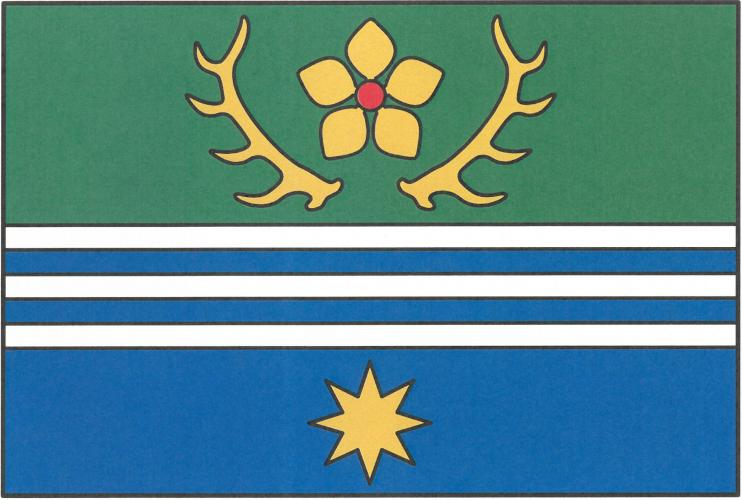
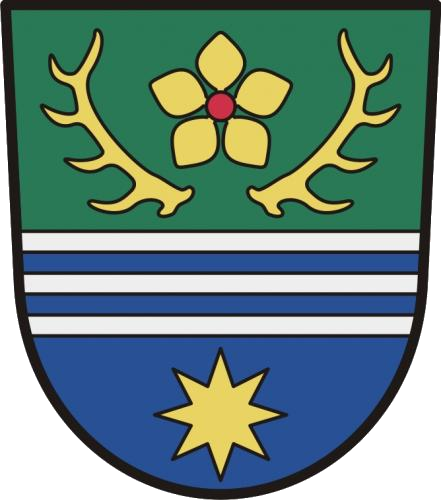
- Flag Coat of arms

- Location in the Czech Republic
- Coordinates: 49°25′32″N 14°16′33″E
- Country: Czech Republic
- Region: South Bohemian
- District: Písek
- First mentioned: 1460

Area
  - Total: 15.75 km^{2} (6.08 sq mi)
- Elevation: 441 m (1,447 ft)

Population (2026-01-01)
  - Total: 110
  - Density: 7.0/km^{2} (18/sq mi)
- Time zone: UTC+1 (CET)
  - Summer (DST): UTC+2 (CEST)
- Postal code: 399 01
- Website: www.obeckvetov.cz

Květov is a municipality and village in Písek District in the South Bohemian Region of the Czech Republic. It has about 100 inhabitants.

Květov lies approximately 18 kilometres (11 mi) north-east of Písek, 53 km (33 mi) north of České Budějovice, and 75 km (47 mi) south of Prague.

== Administrative division ==
Květov consists of two municipal parts (in brackets population according to the 2021 census):

- Květov (83)
- Vůsí (21)

== Demographics ==
Historical population
Year	Pop.	±%
1869	661	—
1880	560	−15.3%
1890	476	−15.0%
1900	489	+2.7%
1910	492	+0.6%
1921	464	−5.7%
1930	458	−1.3%
1950	297	−35.2%
1961	330	+11.1%
1970	255	−22.7%
1980	197	−22.7%
1991	125	−36.5%
2001	107	−14.4%
2011	113	+5.6%
2021	104	−8.0%
Source: Censuses
