= Písek Stone Bridge =

Písek Stone Bridge Kamenný most v Písku
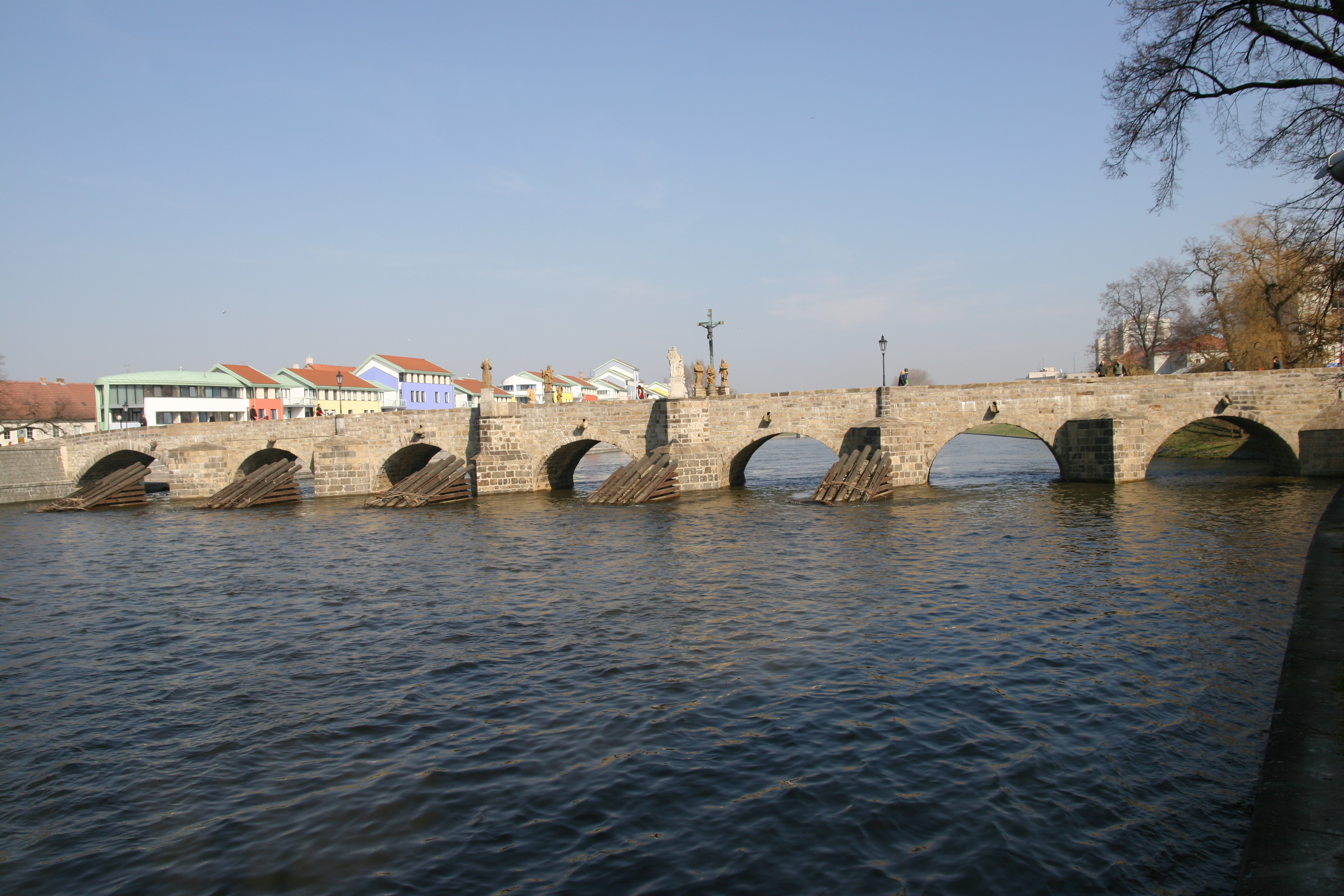
- Písek Stone Bridge in 2006
- Coordinates: 49°18′36″N 14°08′45″E
- Crosses: Otava
- Locale: Písek

Location
- Interactive map of Písek Stone Bridge

The Písek Stone Bridge (Czech: Kamenný most v Písku) is the oldest preserved early Gothic bridge in the Czech Republic and by its originality, although deprived of its dominants, which formed its tower with gates, is one of the rarest medieval bridges in Central Europe. It spans the Otava River, a tributary of the Vltava. It is located in the south Bohemian town of Písek. It was probably built in the 3rd quarter of the 13th century.

The bridge has been on the list of the Czech cultural monuments since 1989, becoming a national cultural monument in 1998.

It is sometimes called the Stag Bridge, according to legend because it was to be named after the first being to pass over it. At the time, Písek was surrounded by deep woods, so the first being to cross the bridge was a stag. However, most local people still call it the Old Bridge.

The bridge became an important link on the Golden Trail, which connected the Baltic areas with the Mediterranean and imported salt from Bavaria to the Písek salt store.

== Structure ==
The bridge was probably built in the 3rd quarter of the 13th century during the reign of Ottokar II of Bohemia. Interestingly, it was built on dry ground. Only after its completion was the river redirected to a new trough, which passed under the bridge.

The length of the bridge is 109.75 m and the width 6.25m. It is built on six pillars and has seven arches and gives the impression of a "small" Charles Bridge. Six arches are original. The seventh arch, with a double span width, was added in 1768 and served for the raft passage (timber used to be pulled down the river). Two towers guarded the bridge, one on each side. Neither of them has survived. The first collapsed during the 1768 flood and the second was deliberately torn down in 1825 due to the growing transportation demands. Their fragments, salvaged from the river bottom, are on display on the left river bank near the bridge.

== Sculptures ==
Originally, the bridge was without a sculptural decoration. Today, replicas of Baroque sculptures are lining the bridge. Their sandstone originals can be seen in the Prácheň Museum. There are four sculptural groups:

- Calvary dates from the 18th century and was sculpted in the Jan Hammer workshop. Statues of the Virgin Mary, Mary Magdalene and the Apostle John are arranged around a 6-meter high Cross with Christ. Replicas come from 1997.
- John of Nepomuk with two angels - original by an unknown author
- Saint Anne original - original dates from 1770
- Saint Anthony of Padua - original dates from 1770

=== Bridge statues ===
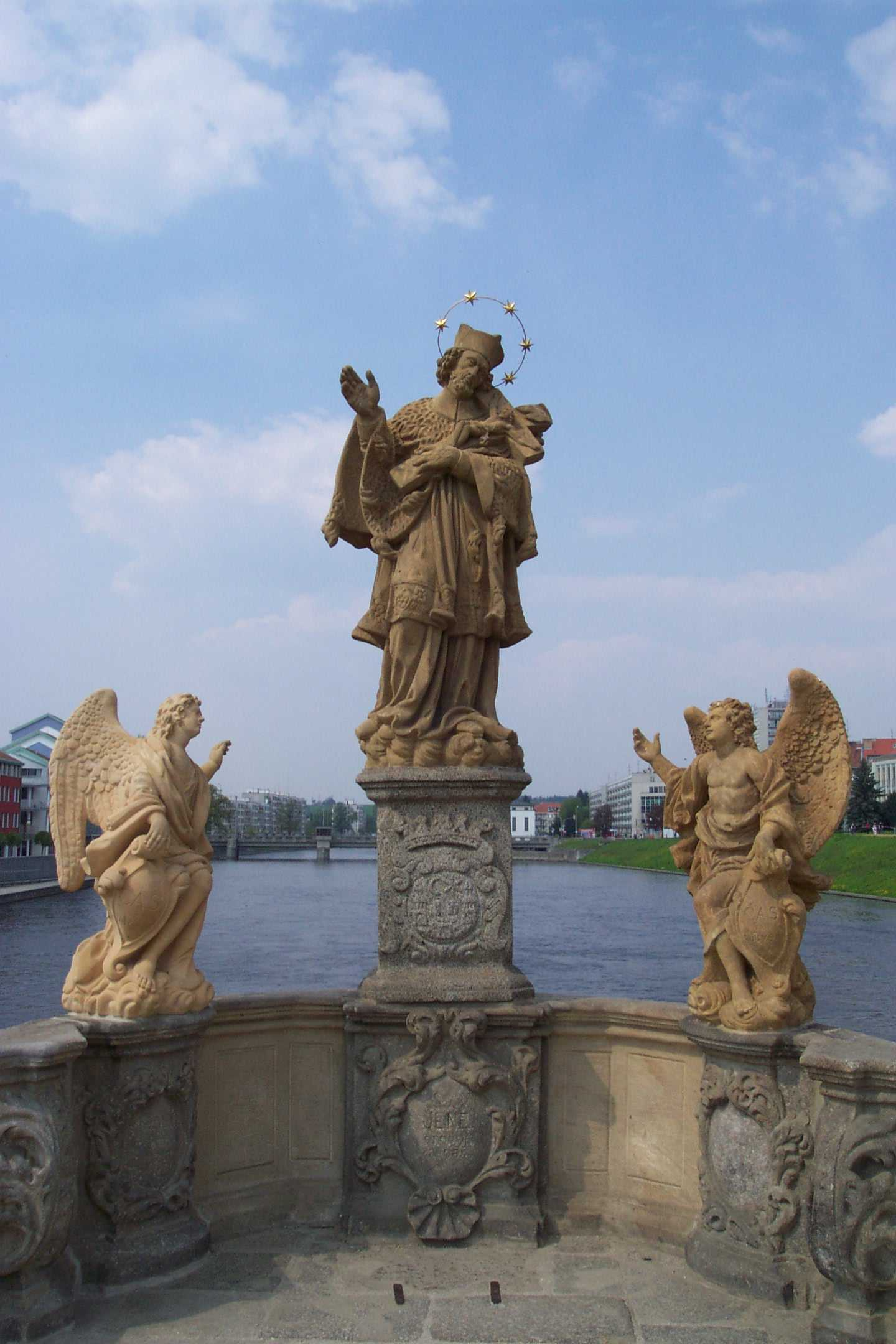
John of Nepomuk with Písek's coat of arms

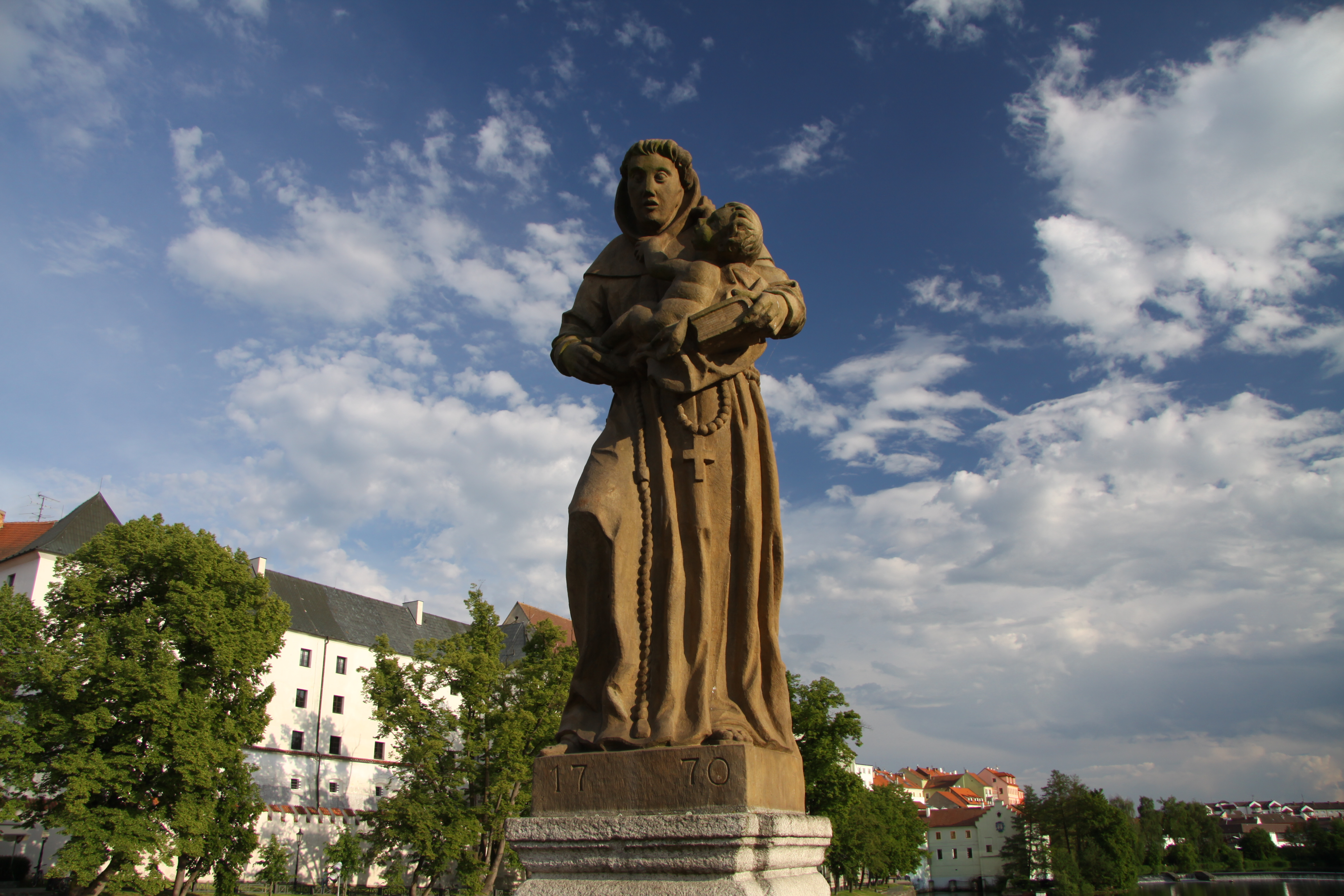
Saint Anthony of Padua (1770)

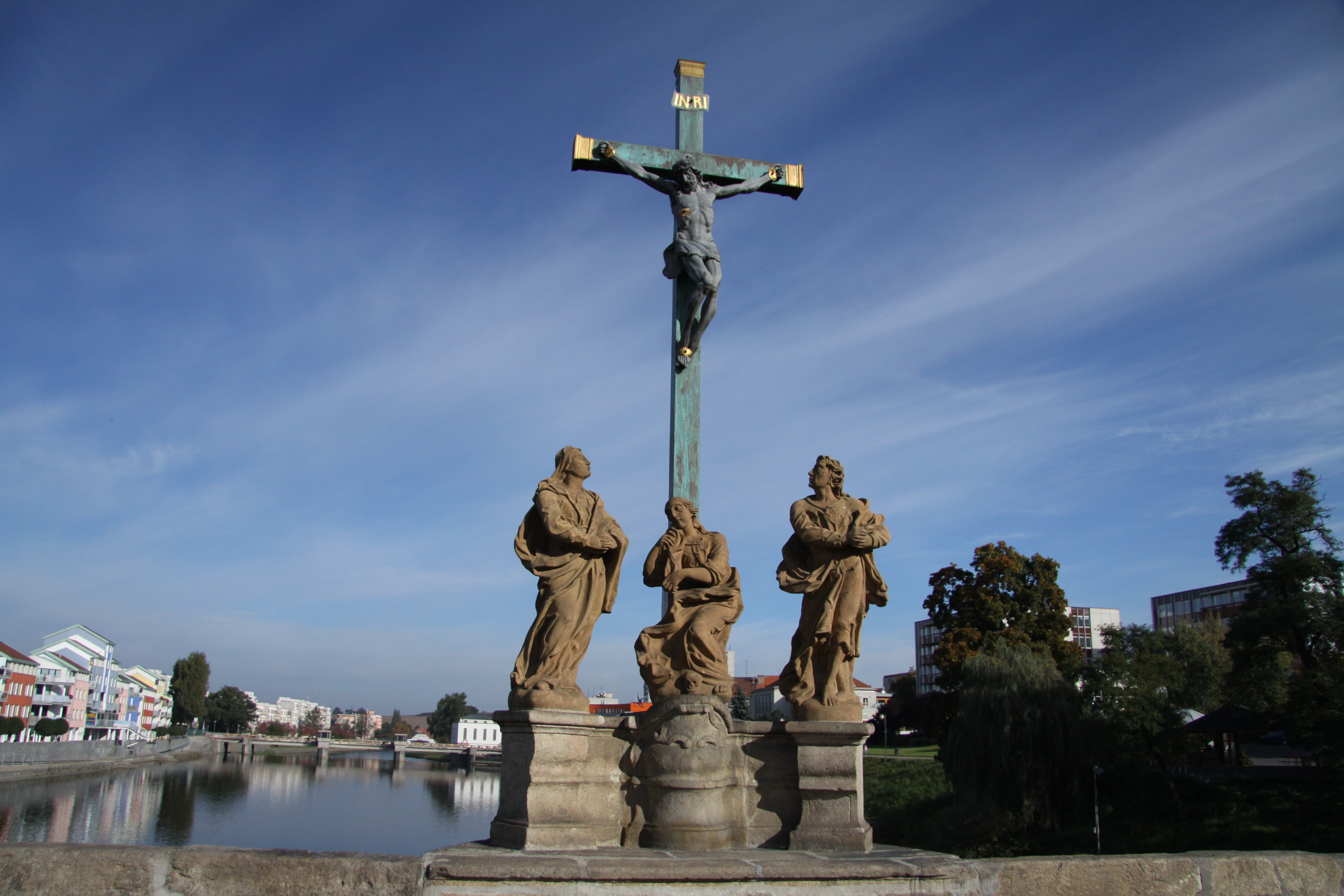
Calvary

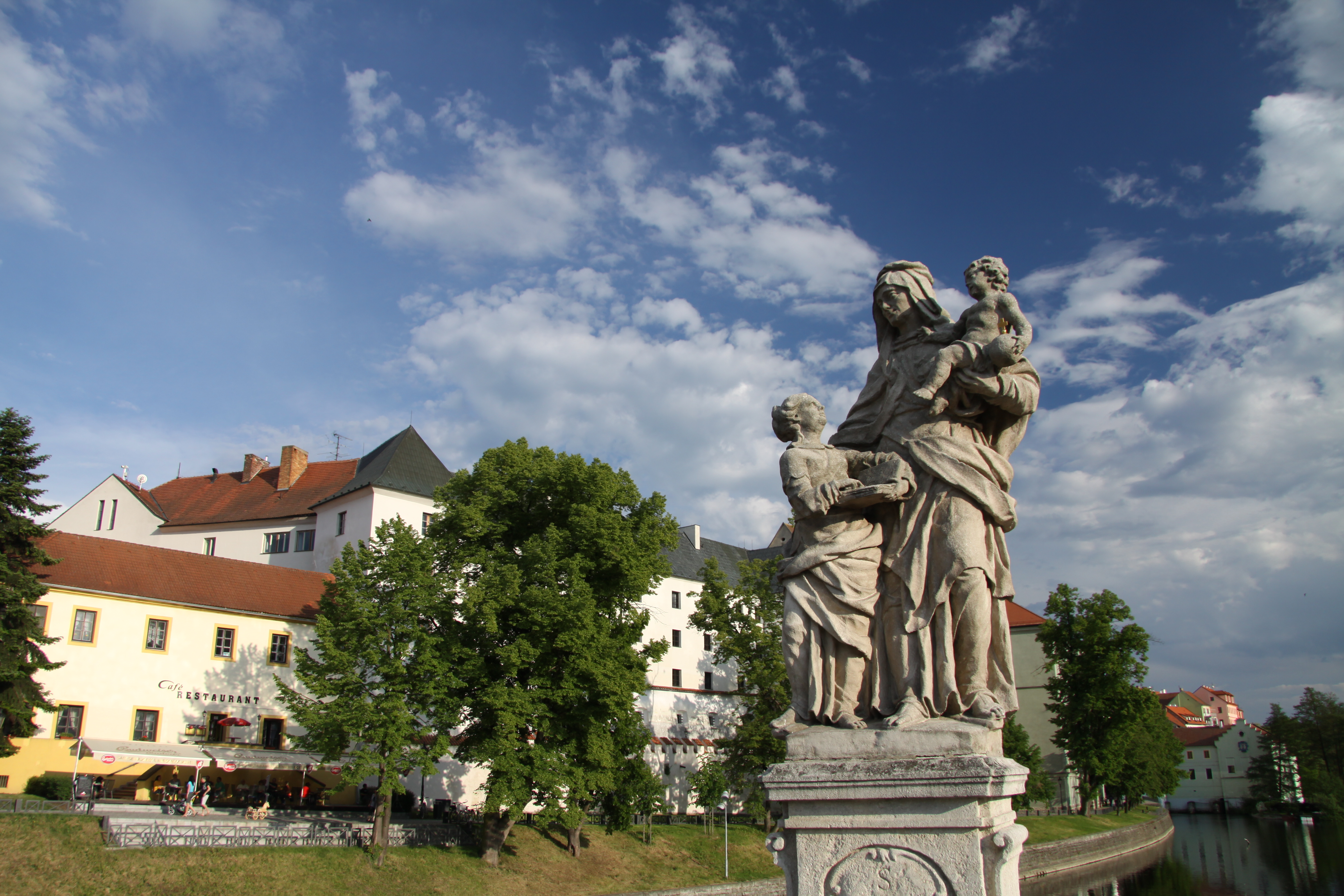
Saint Anne (1770)
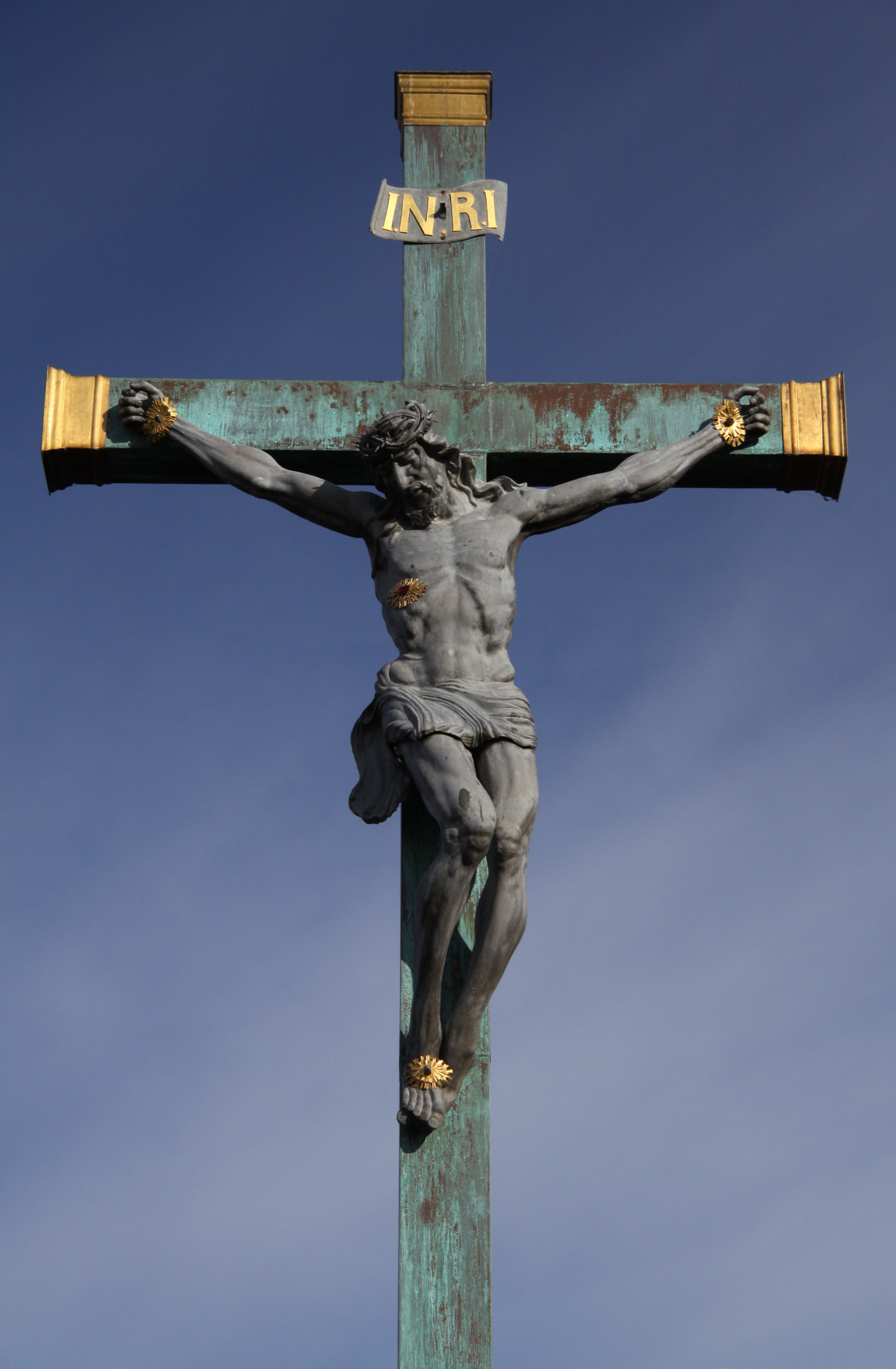
Christ on Cross

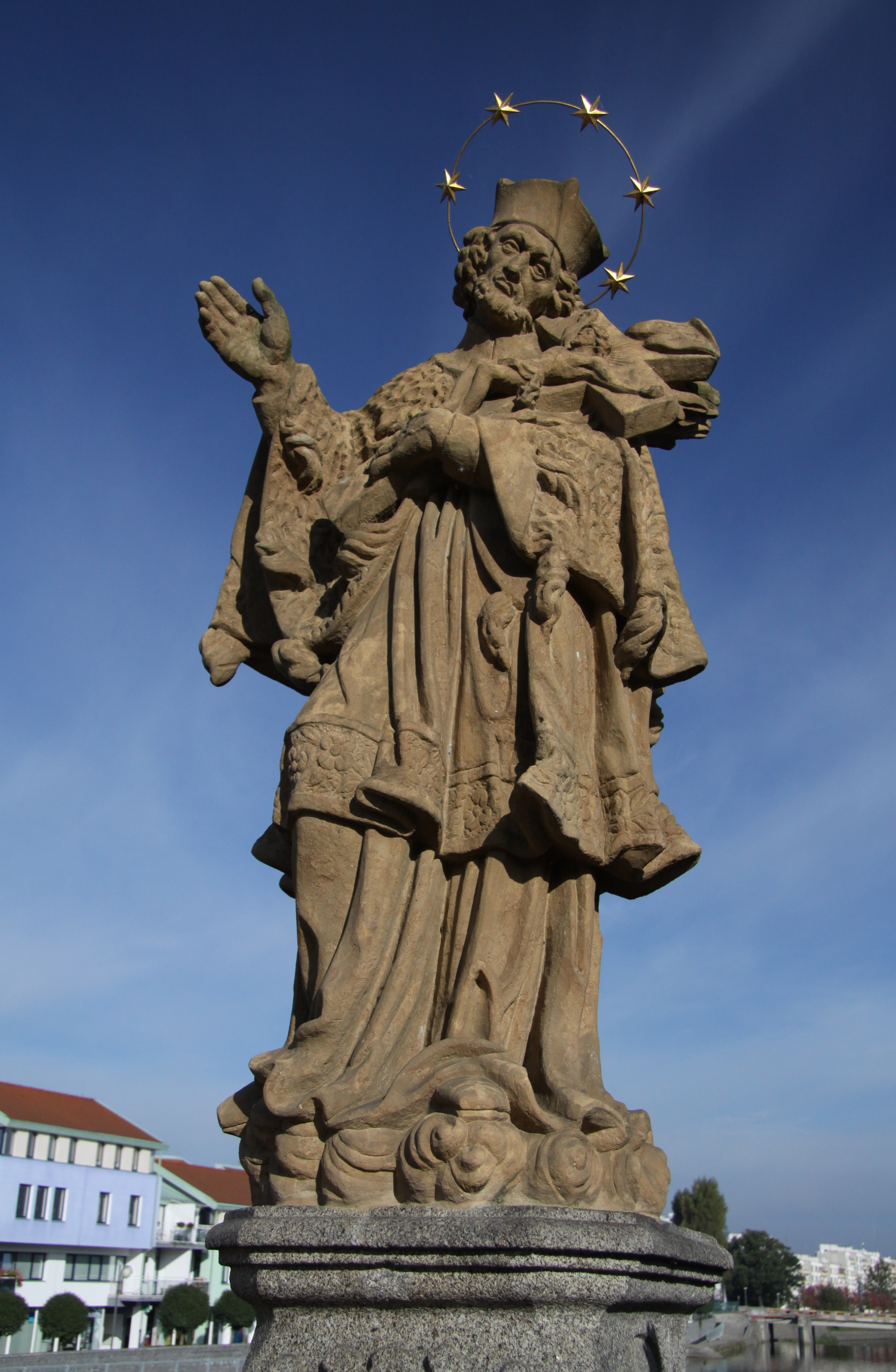
John of Nepomuk

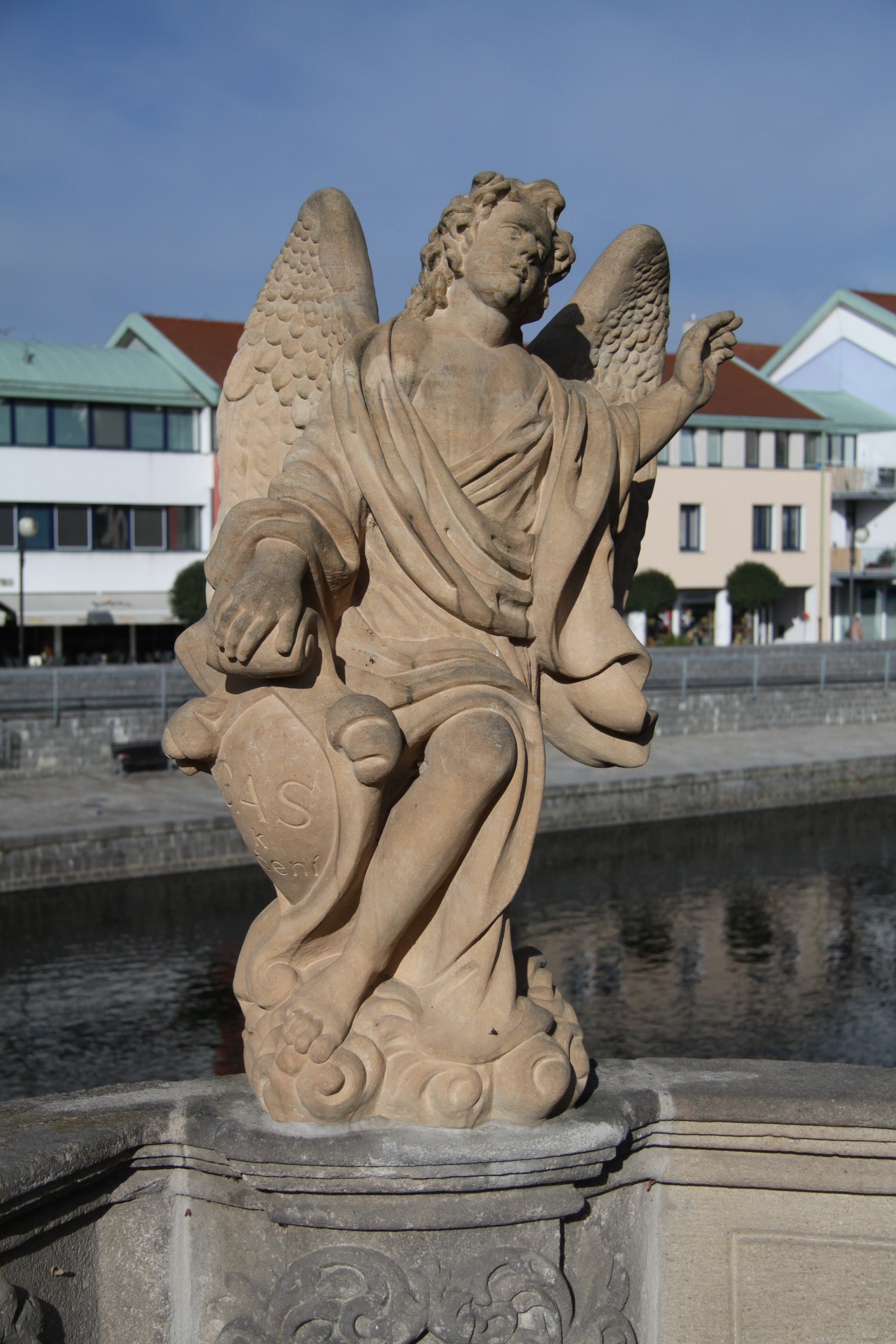
Angel

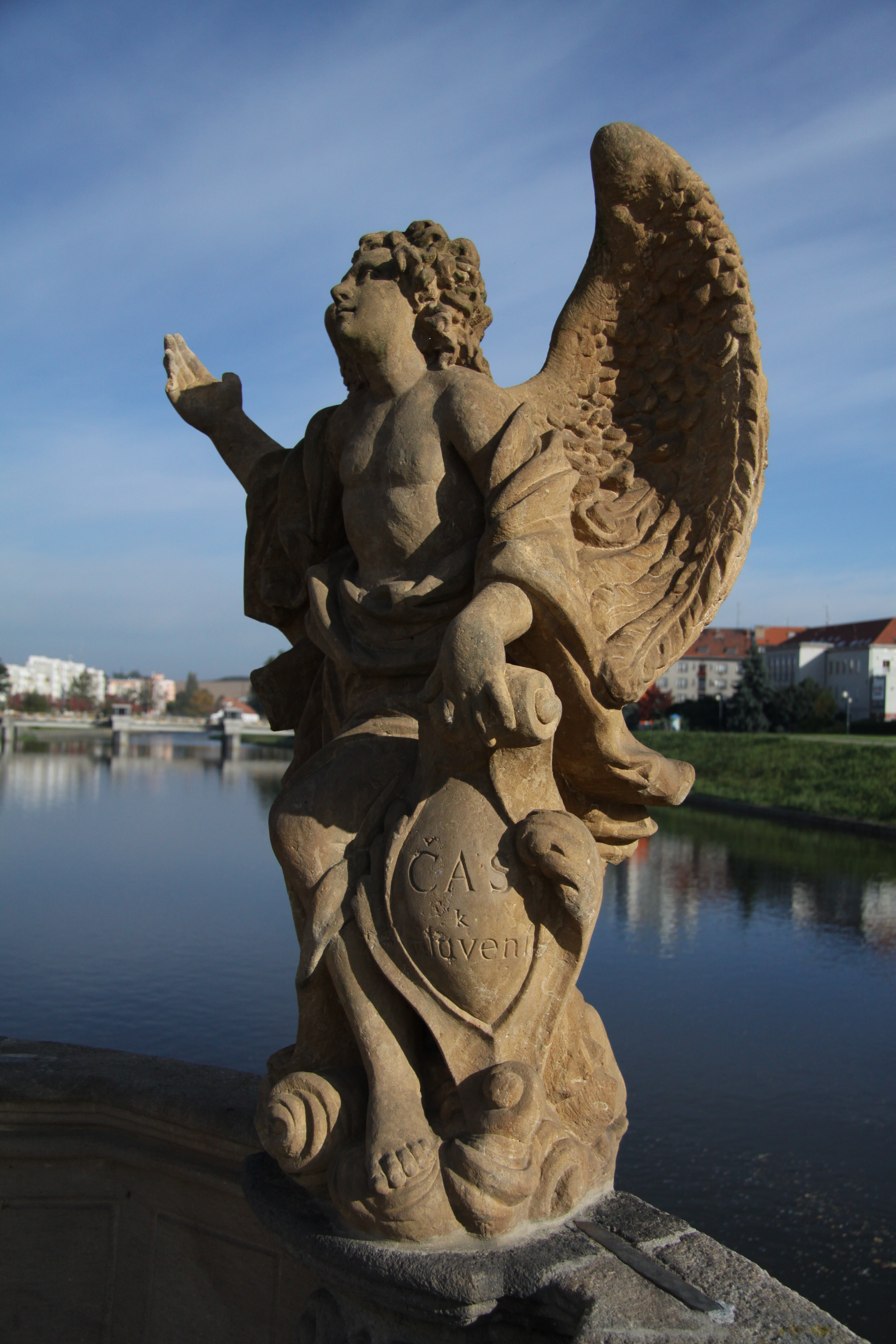
Angel

== Floods ==
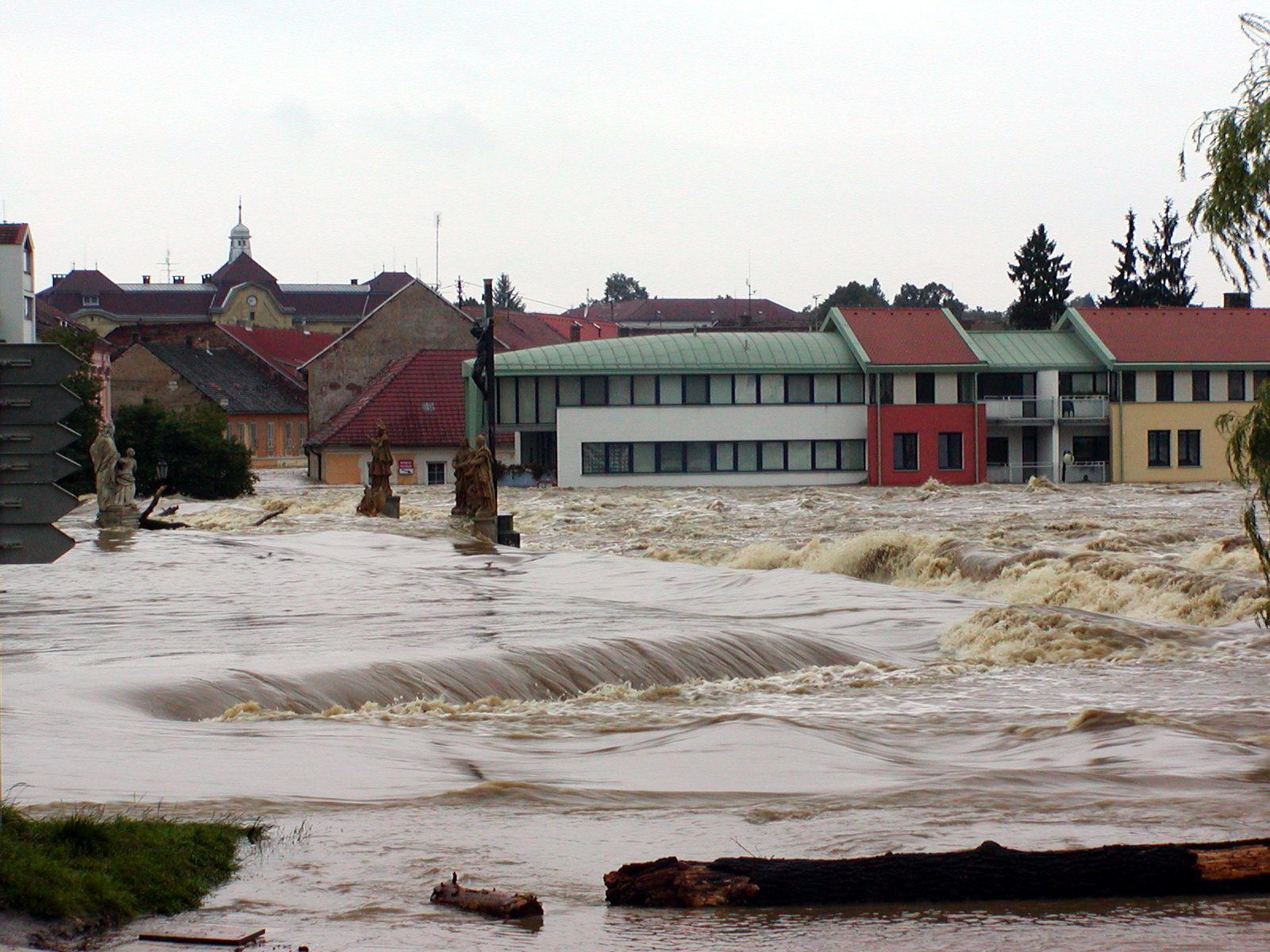
Only the statues and cross on the Písek Stone Bridge could be seen during the floods of autumn 2002.

The bridge has been exposed to the onslaught of floods several times throughout the centuries, for example in 1432 and 1768. The most recent being the "thousand year flood" of 2002, when the Otava water level rose so high that it tore off a stone wall. Despite the current's fifty-fold increase in force, however, the bridge structure withstood the flood. The flood water removed the railings and some statues. After the flood, town of Písek started a general bridge reconstruction. The railings and statues were repaired; copy of the lost statue was recreated and the structure was retrofitted with a net of concrete and iron tubes. The bridge repair was enabled thanks to a public fundraiser that spontaneously started after the flood.

== Cyclone ==
On 20 January 2007 cyclone Kyrill damaged the Christ Cross, luckily, the statue itself was almost undamaged. During the cross restoration historical documents were discovered in two time capsules placed inside the cross. There was a report by sculptor Karel Vlačiha about a repair the cross underwent between 1897 and 1899. The second report was related to the repairs done between 1957 and 1959. This report was accompanied with a period copy of Rudé právo, then a leading newspaper of the Czechoslovak communist party.

== See also ==
- Charles Bridge, the second oldest bridge in the Czech Republic
