= Church of the Nativity of the Blessed Virgin Mary (Písek) =

Roman Catholic basilica in the Czech Republic

Coordinates: 49.3064°N 14.1492°E

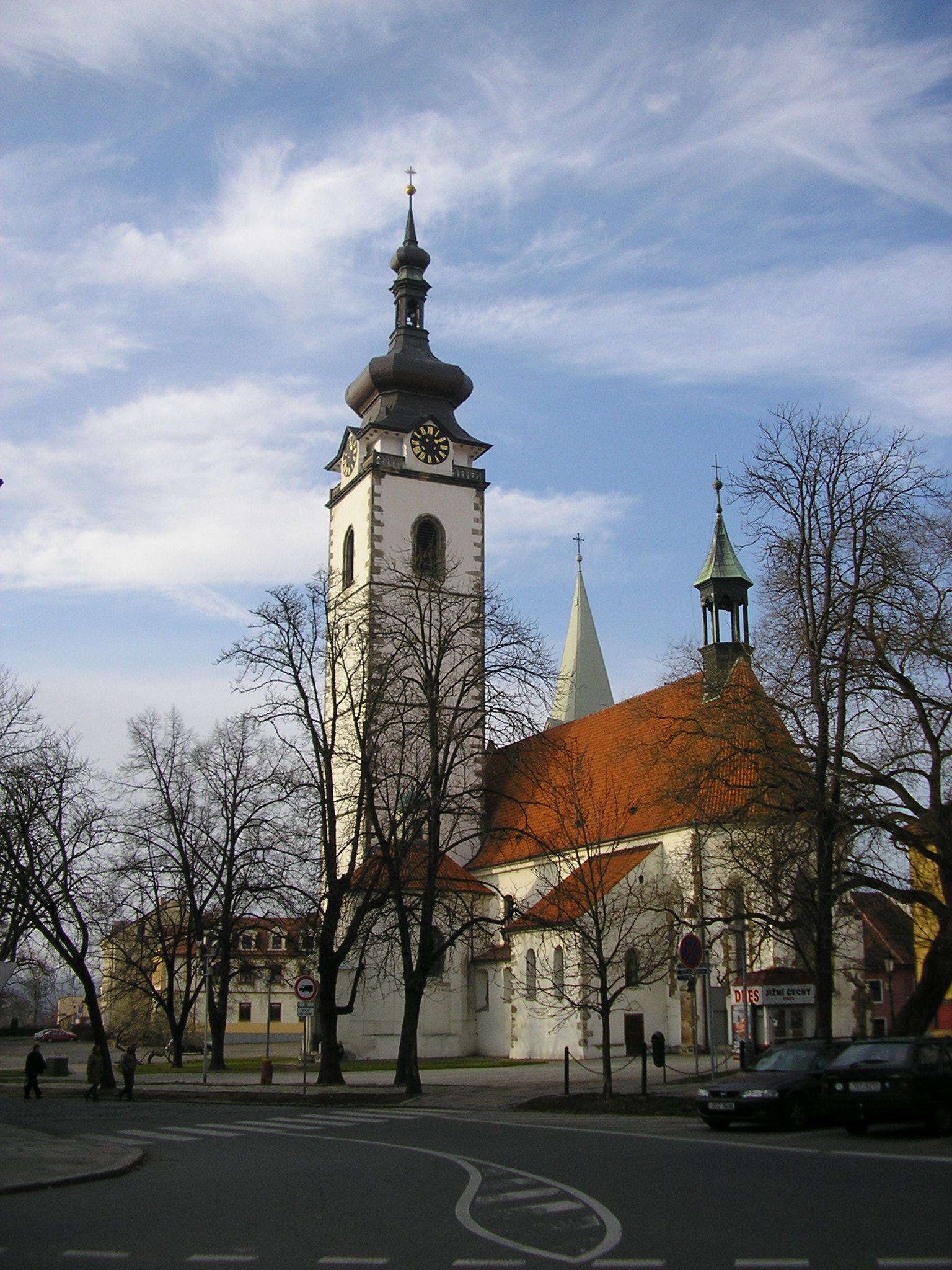
Church of the Nativity of the Virgin Mary

Church of the Nativity of the Virgin Mary (Czech: Kostel Narození Panny Marie) is a Roman Catholic basilica in Písek in the South Bohemian Region of the Czech Republic. It has a nave, two aisles, and a bell tower on the south side of the western facade which has become a symbol of the town. It is also the highest building in Písek.

== History ==
The construction of the church started with the building of presbytery in 1240. Walls of the presbytery together with its polygonal ending were made first. Then was built a roof frame, which was protecting the work during the construction of the vault. There was built a temporary wall in a triumphal arch of the presbytery to start the religious ceremonials before the church construction was completed.

The work continued with a construction of two towers in corners of the western facade. At the same time were built side walls of the church. A main entrance was built in the northern wall, which was quite uncommon.

After finishing the exterior walls a sacristy by the presbytery and an arcade, they were able to build a cross vault above the nave and two aisles. After that, the temporary wall was demolished and the church was completed. The church was probably consecrated around 1360. The Late Gothic construction period is connected with the master builder Mikulas Pisecký, who changed the western facade and he constructed the south tower. The Neo-Gothic reconstruction was made according to plans by the architect Josef Mocker.

== Exterior ==
=== Western facade ===
The entrance portal in this part of the church was built in the middle of the 14th century. There are reliefs on the edge of the portal. One of them is Mikuláš Písecký himself, builder of the monumental bell tower and in his text is written about the construction of the tower. Other reliefs possibly show the king Vladislaus II of Hungary (Jagiellon) and his son Louis II. There is a pointed window above the entrance portal, which is decorated by sacral motifs and statues. Next to the window is a relief of Crowned Virgin Mary with child. There is also a staircase to the organ loft in the wall of the northern tower.

==== The tower ====
The monumental southern tower built in the western facade is 74 metres (243 ft) in height and has become the symbol of the town Písek. The construction of the tower started in 1489. In 1555 lightning hit the new tower and it burned down. During the following reconstruction was built the bulbous roof (also called onion roof) instead of the old saddle roof.

At the top is an observation deck with a tracery railing. Behind the observation deck is a room for watchman, because in the past was the tower a part of the town defense system. At each side of the observation deck are clocks, which were moved from the city castle in 1860. There are some pointed windows at each side of the tower.

=== Northern facade ===
During the reconstruction of the tower in the 16th-century were made changes also in the northern part of the church. Above the north portal were built Renaissance shield arches with a new roof construction of the northern aisle. In 1726 was built an entrance hall in front of the entrance portal. It was removed in the middle of the 19th century while the church was in another reconstruction. In the same years an old sacristy next to the presbytery was demolished. The window above the old sacristy was enlarged to the same height as other windows in the presbytery. It has become the biggest window in the presbytery because of the original window. Windows in the nave above aisles or in the sacristy are usually wider than in the presbytery.

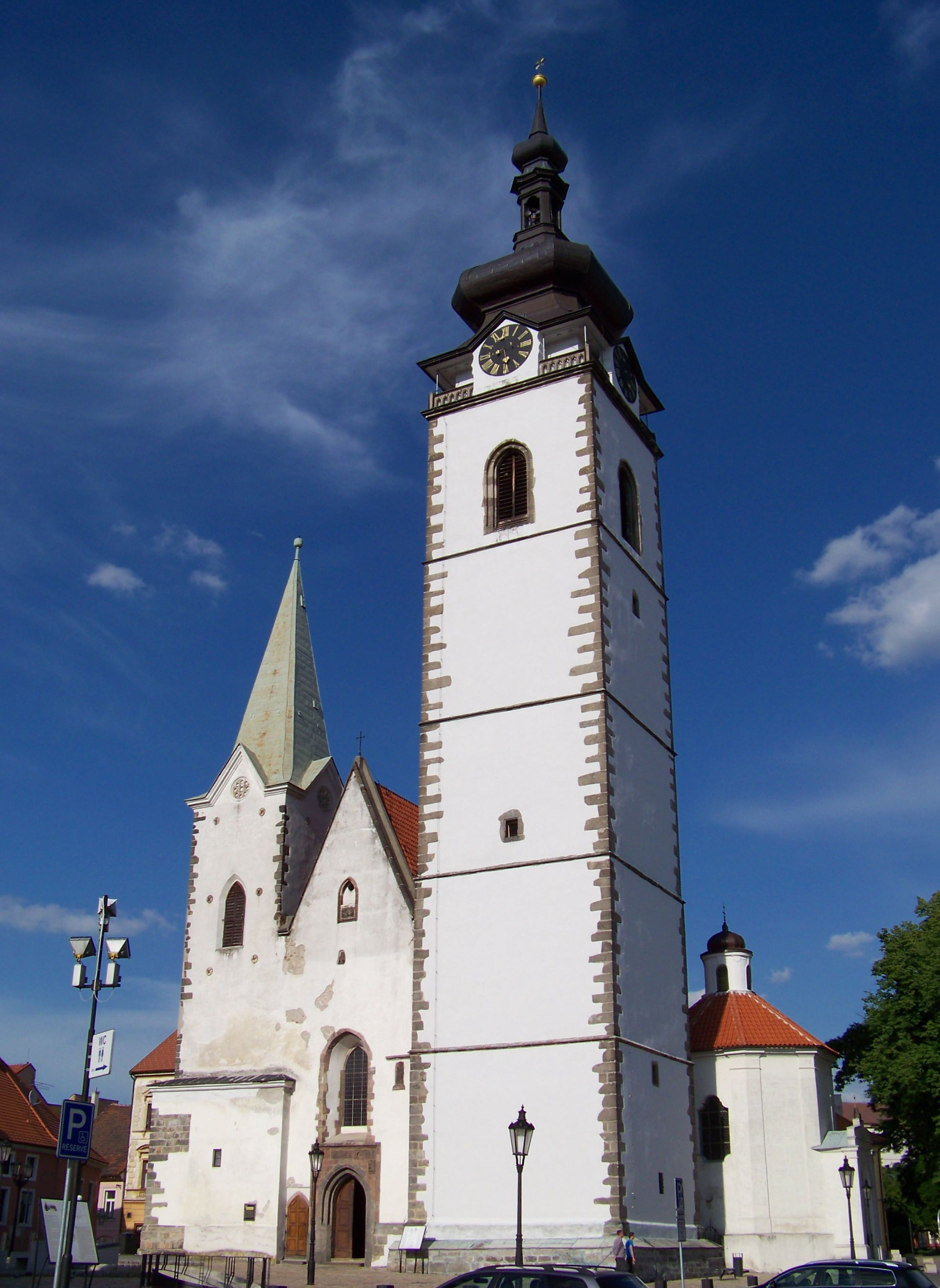
Western facade

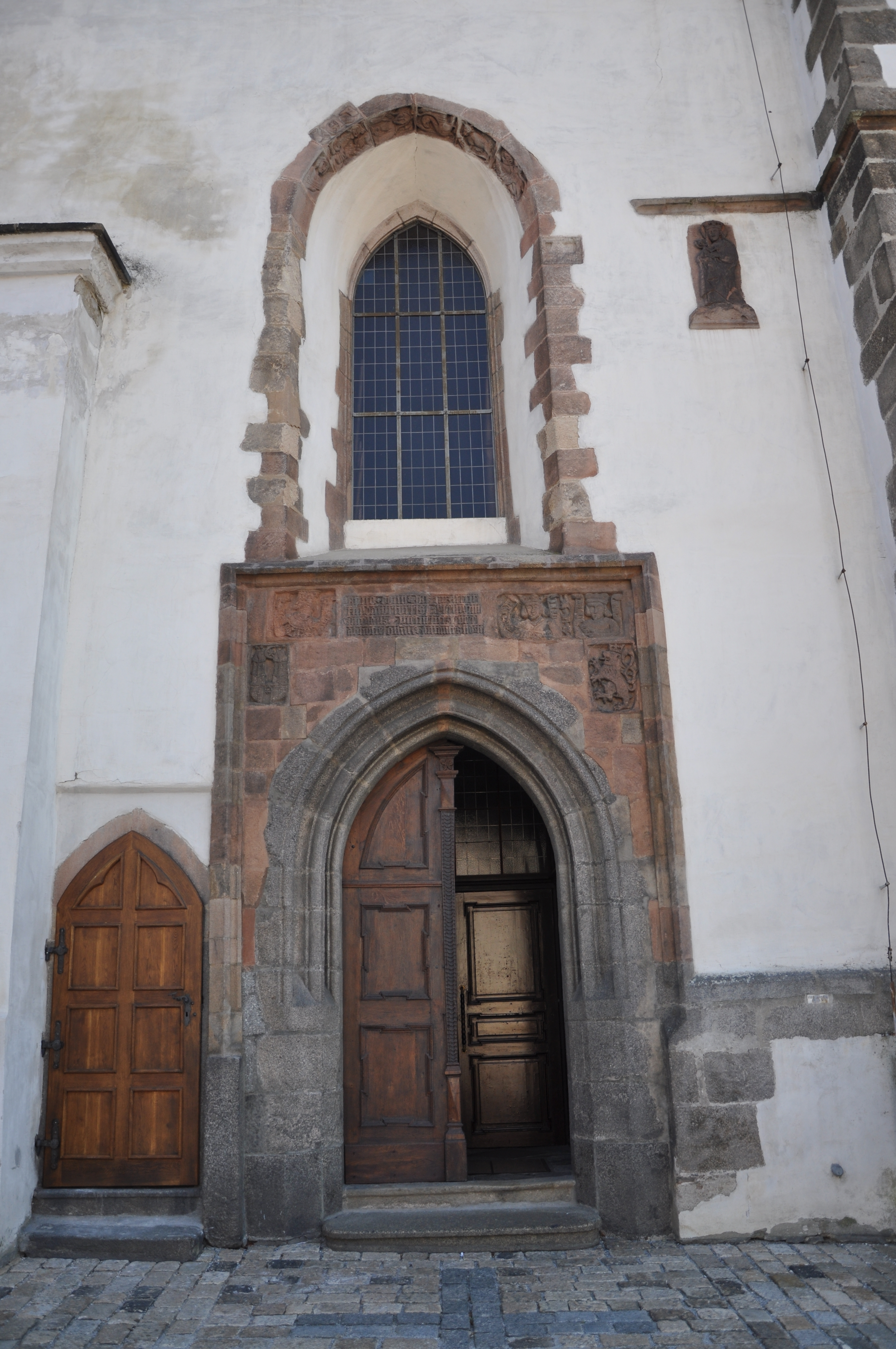
Entrance portal

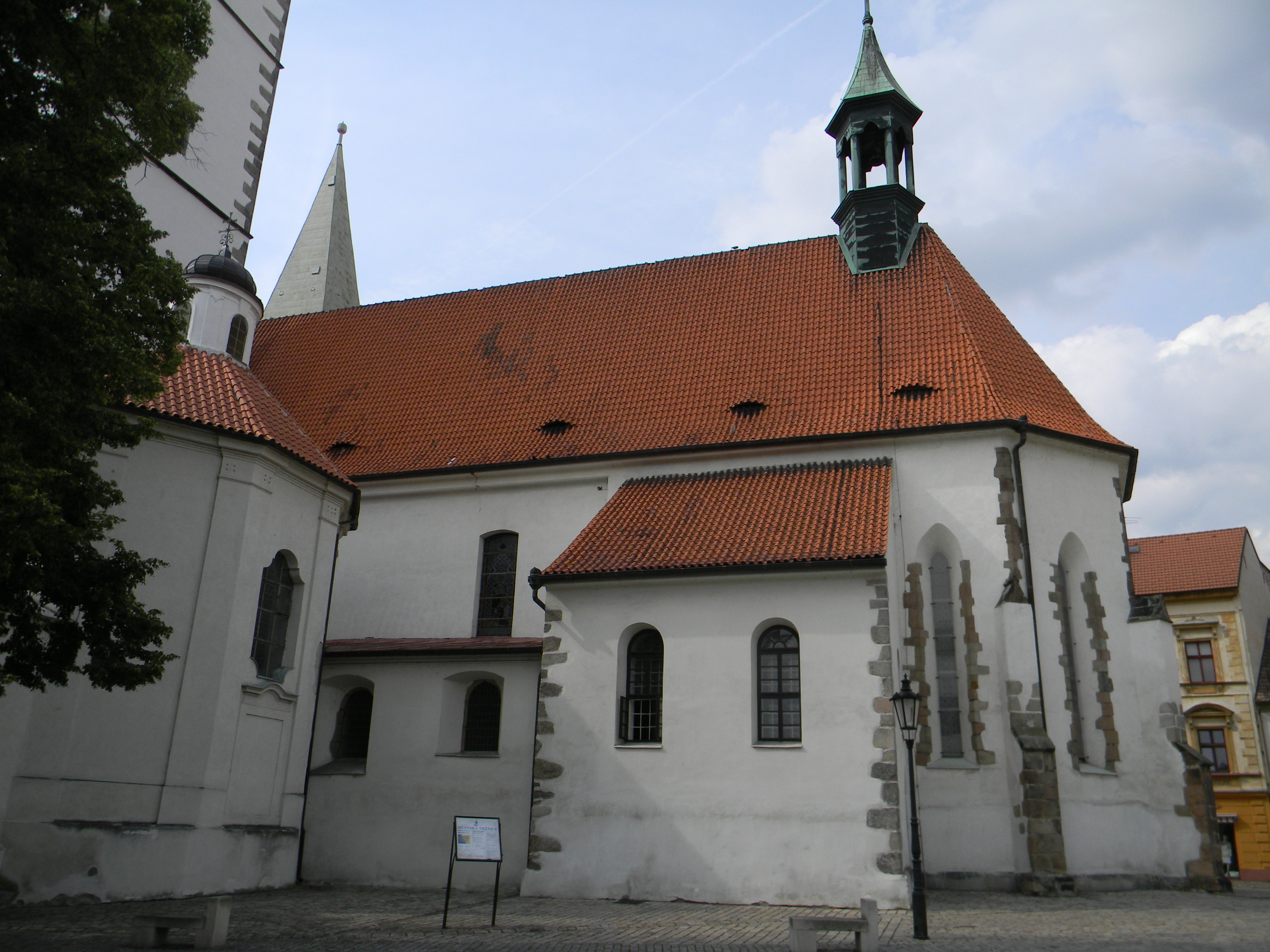
Southern facade

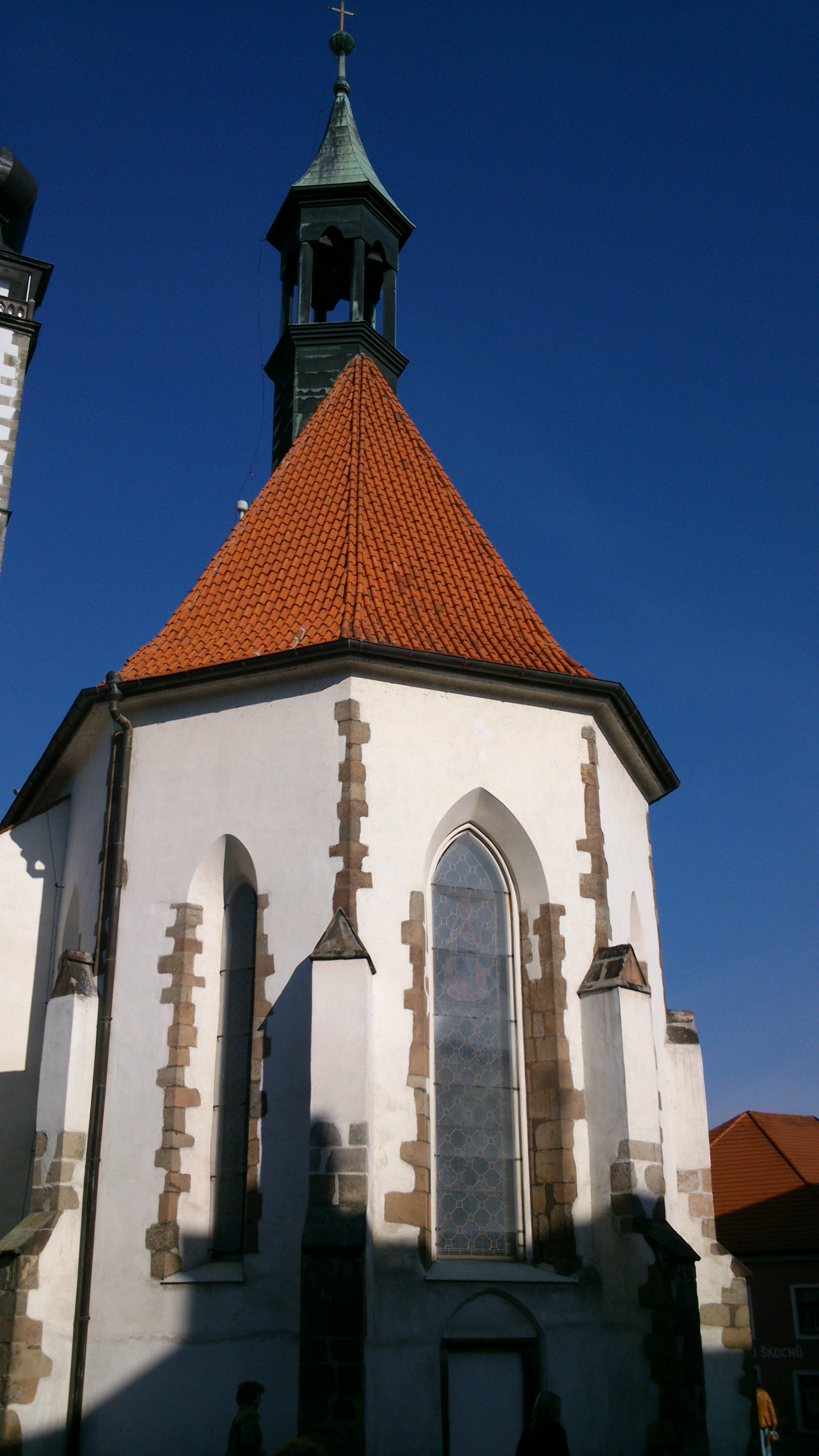
Presbytery

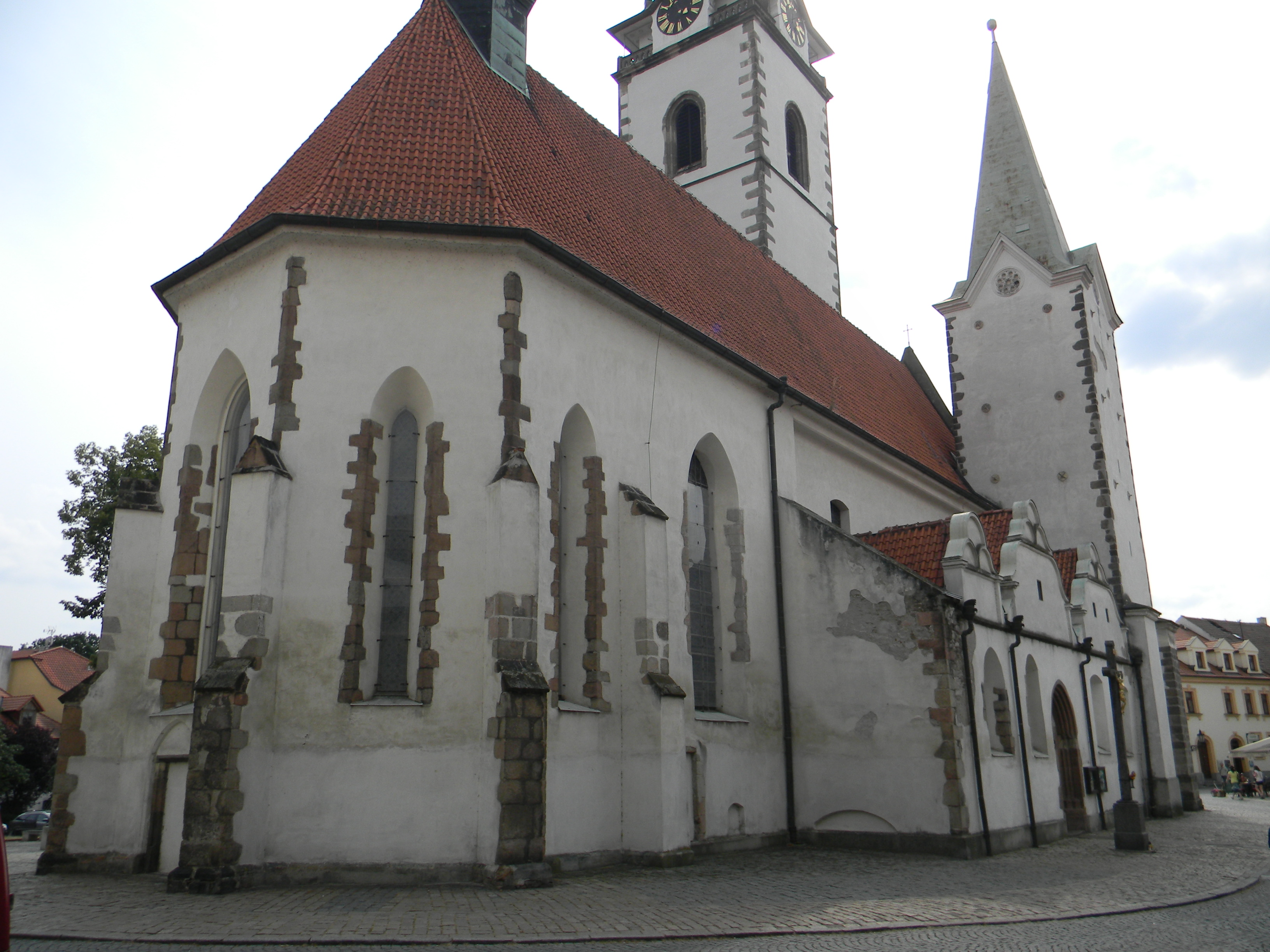
Northern facade

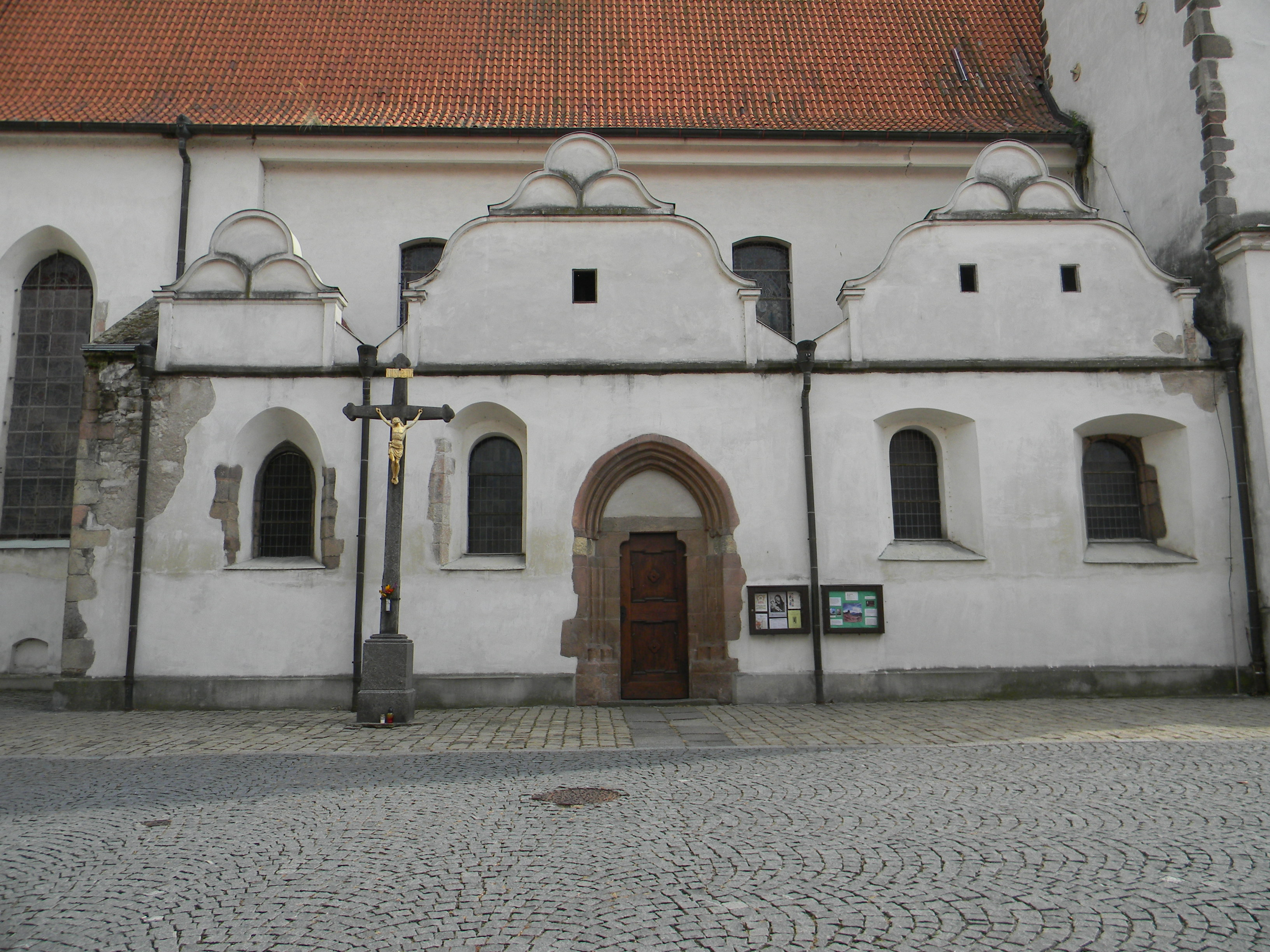
Northern facade with original entrance portal

== Interior ==
In the church was used a so-called "bonded construction system" in which the length of one field of the nave correspond to the two fields of the aisle and to two arcades. The system was interrupted by the tower which was built on the two western fields of the southern aisle.

=== Presbytery ===
The presbytery contains one cross-rib vaulted bay and polygonal ending, which is radially vaulted and in its center is a simple keystone without any decoration. The second keystone in the western part has been decorated with a radially lined up overlapping leaves. The axial pointed window is noticeably larger than other pointed windows, except the widened window in the northern facade.
The adjoining bay of the presbytery has a ribbed vault connected to the reduced supports of the vault ended by a console. The consoles have simple floral and geometric motifs.

=== Nave ===
Also, the nave has the cross-ribbed vault with reduced supports. Massive columns and the simple shaped arcade look heavy-footed. The supports of the vault ended on a cornice of columns. From the cornice come out a cuboidal slab to the pointed arch. In every bay of the nave is a window above the arcade which is a typical feature of the basilica. In the western part of the church was built the organ loft which is supported by the cross vault. It creates a quite lowered space behind the entrance portal.

On the border of the northern aisle and the nave are placed paintings Enthroned Madonna and Jesus crowned by two angels from 1270. The fresco of the Crucifixion is on the border of the southern aisle and the nave.

=== Aisles ===
In the southern aisle next to the fresco of the Crucifixion is an altar of the Virgin Mary of Písek from the middle of the 14th century. The original painting of the Virgin Mary has been stolen and from the 1975 is exhibited a copy. On the left are vaulted windows with expanded moulding. There is also an entrance to the Chapel of Saint John of Nepomuk, which was added in years 1741–1743 to the southern aisle. This radical extension of the church ground plan was possible, because a churchyard was moved behind the city wall in 1549. Today the chapel serves as the sacristy and it has its own entrance, which was made in 1723.

The northern aisle is less changed by reconstructions. In the western part are enlarged columns bearing the weight of the north tower and half of the organ loft. In the middle is the old entrance portal, right in the opposite to the entrance to the Chapel of Saint John of Nepomuk.

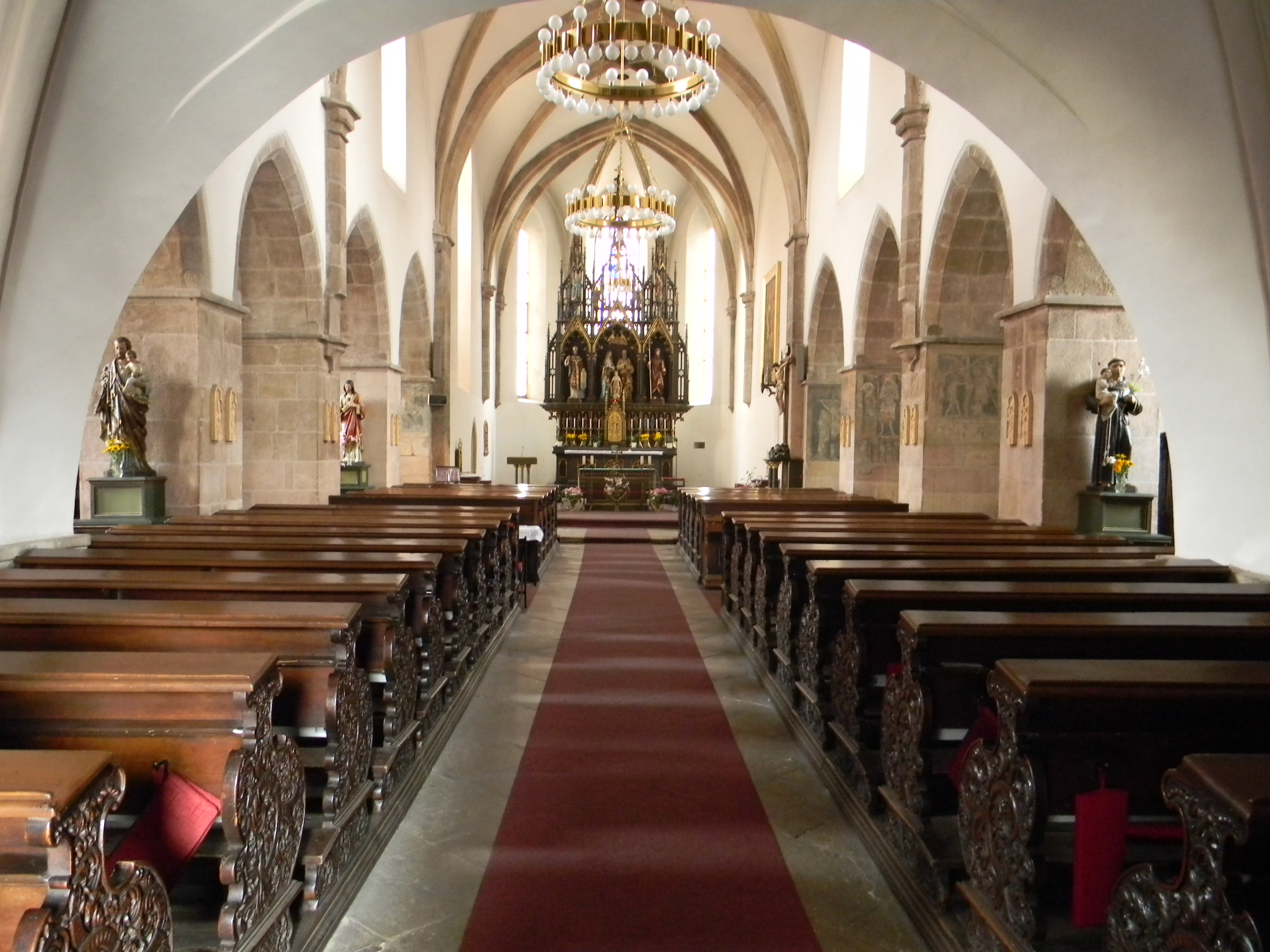
Nave from organ loft

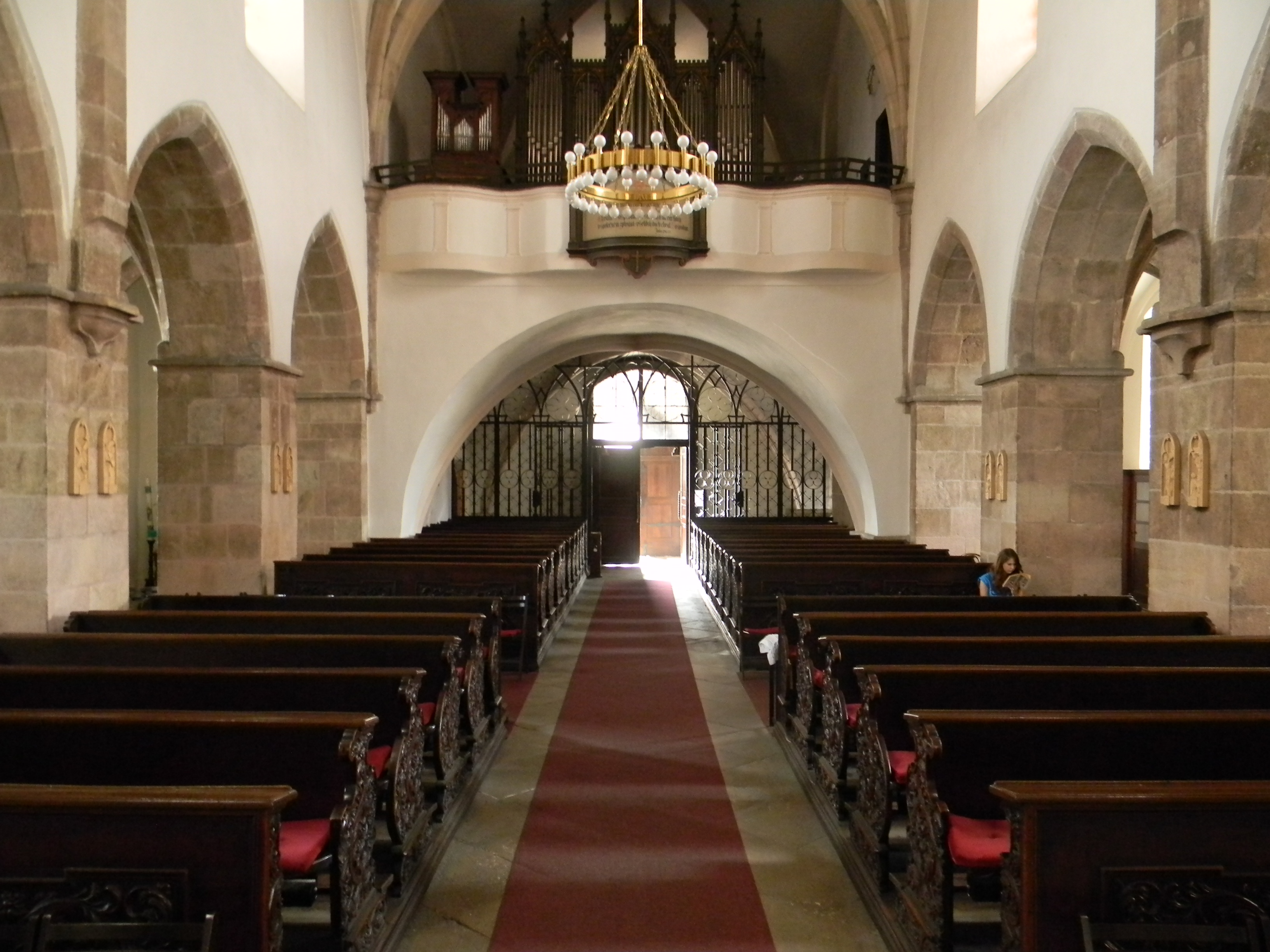
Nave from chancel

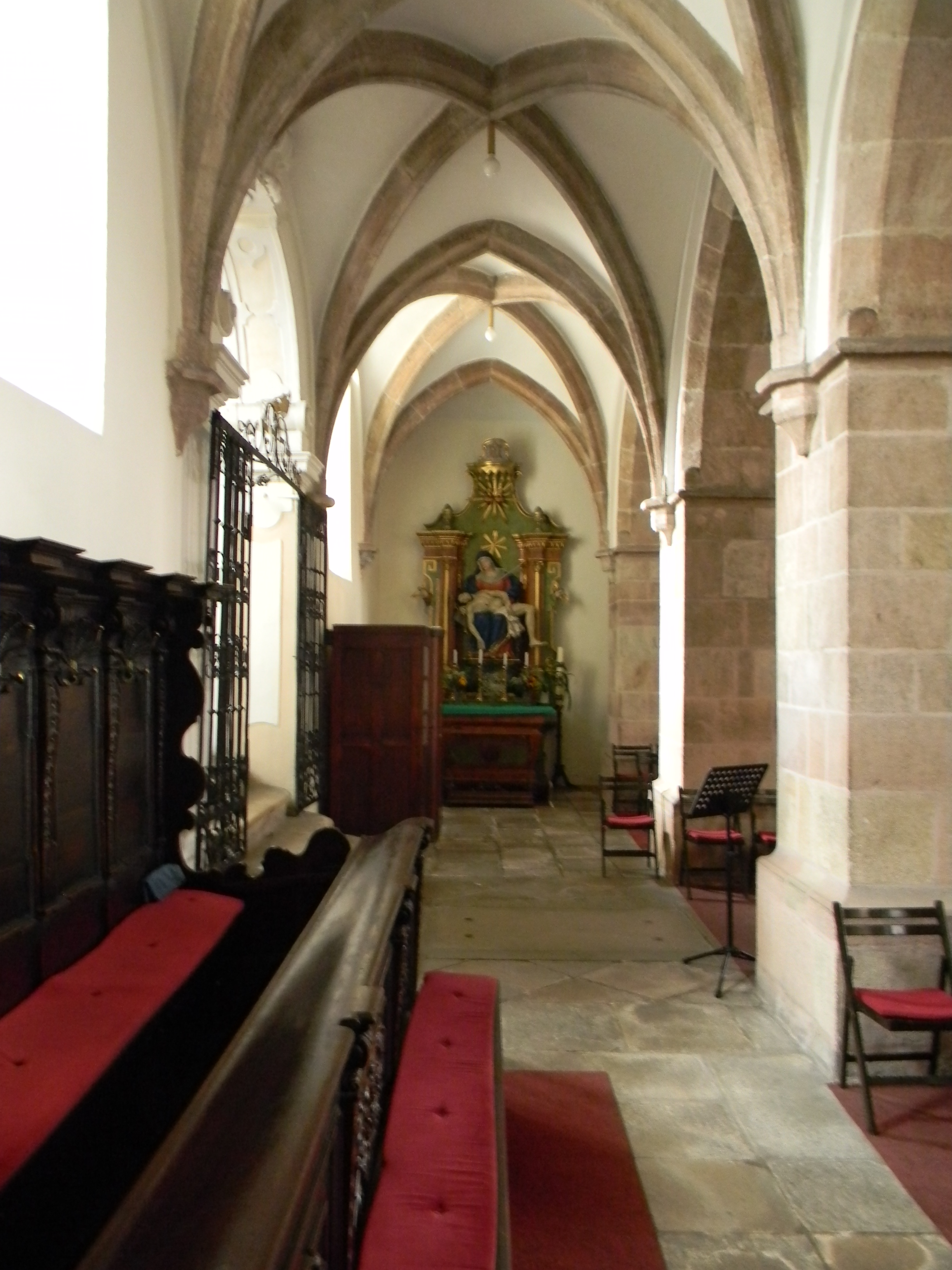
Southern aisle from altar of the Virgin Mary

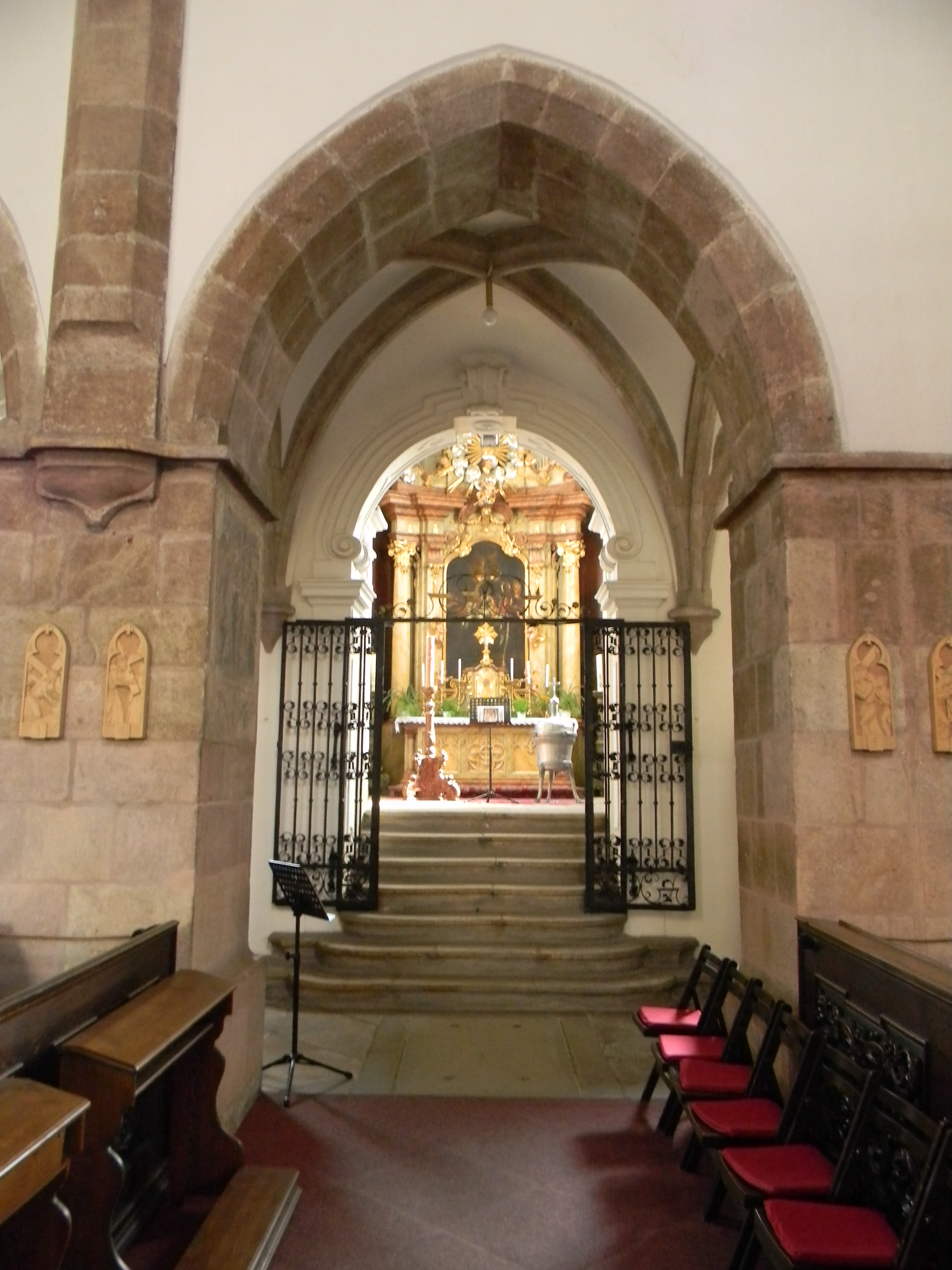
Connection of Chapel of Saint John of Nepomuk

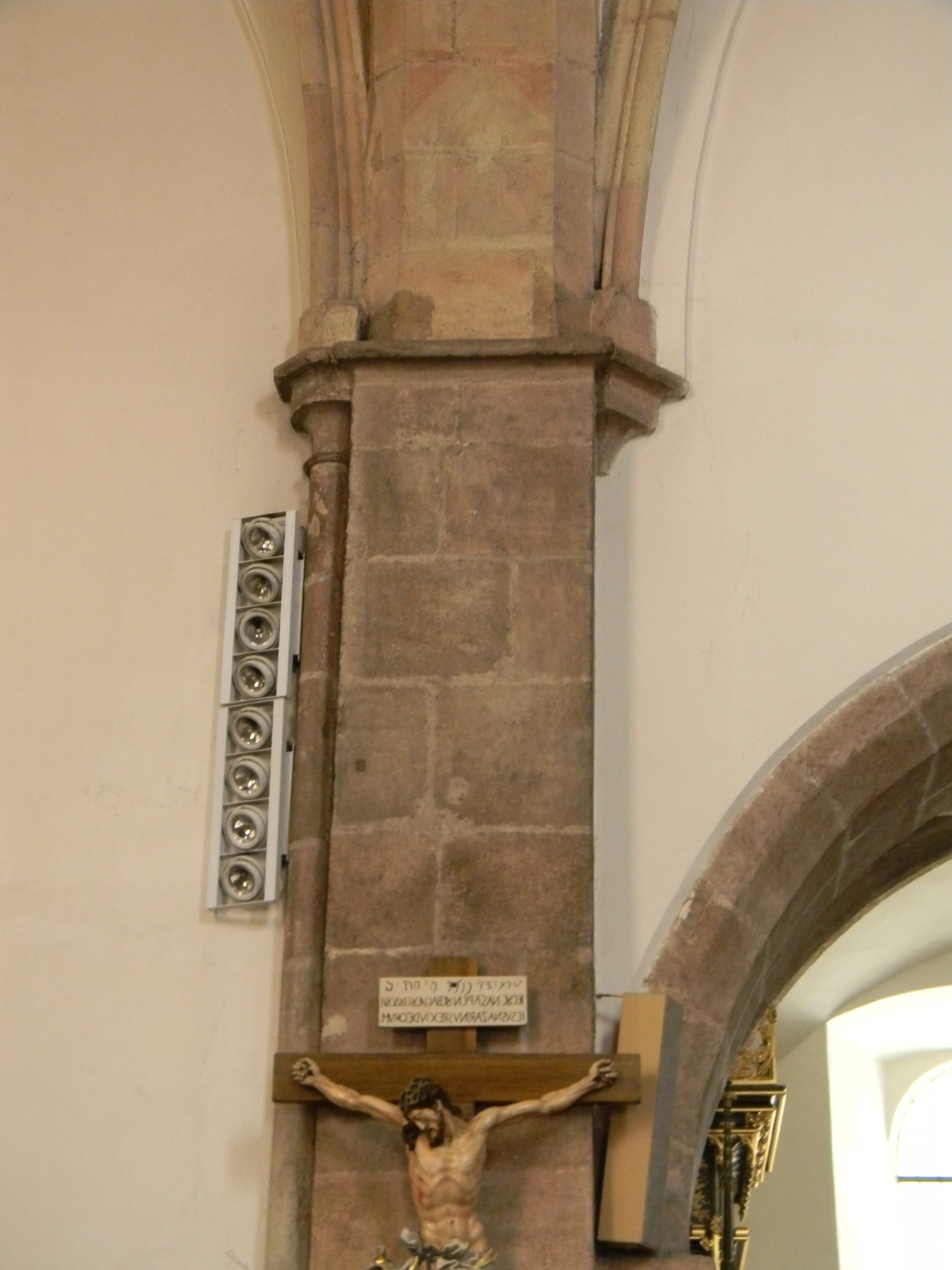
Triumphal arch

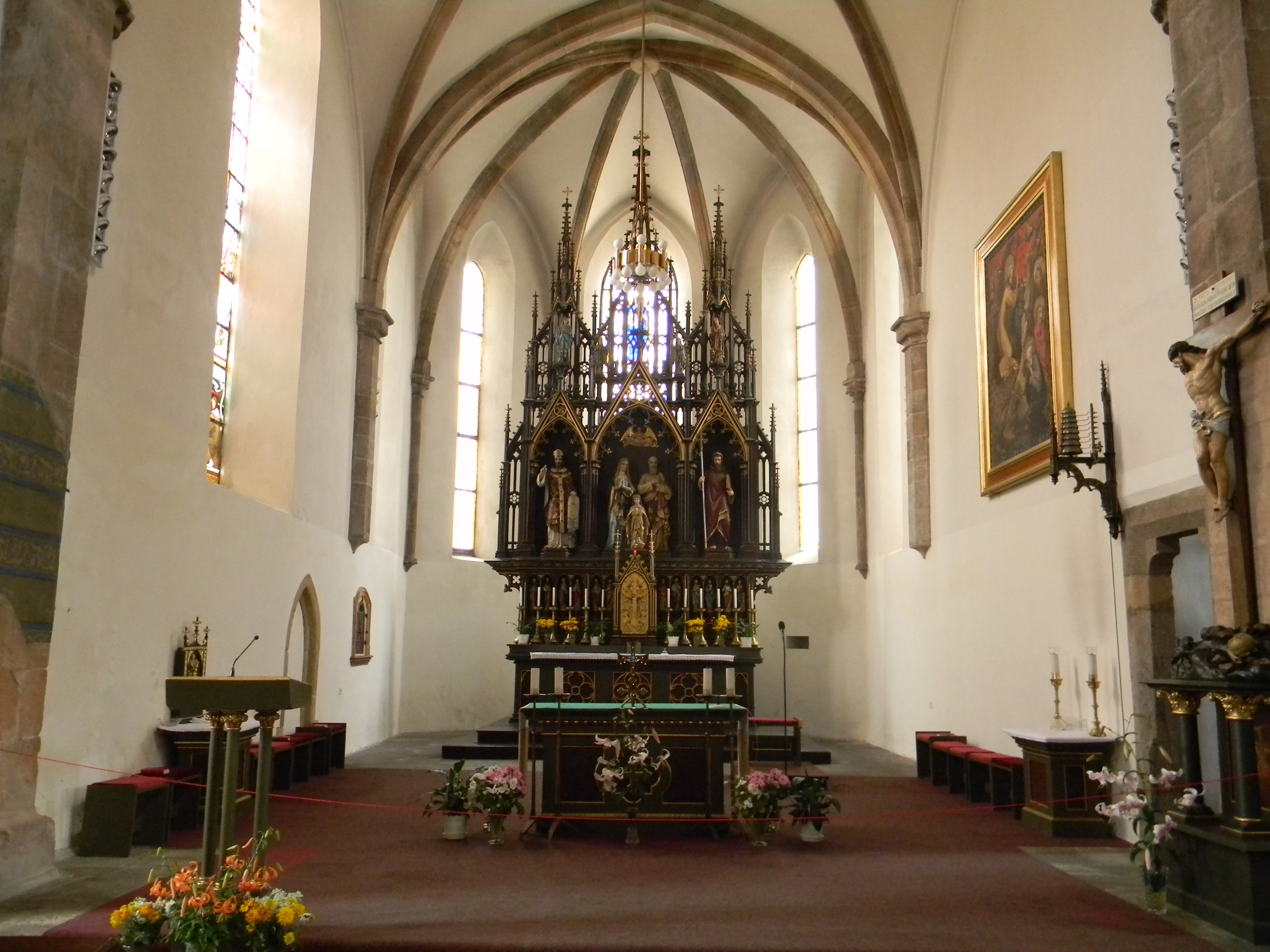
Main altar

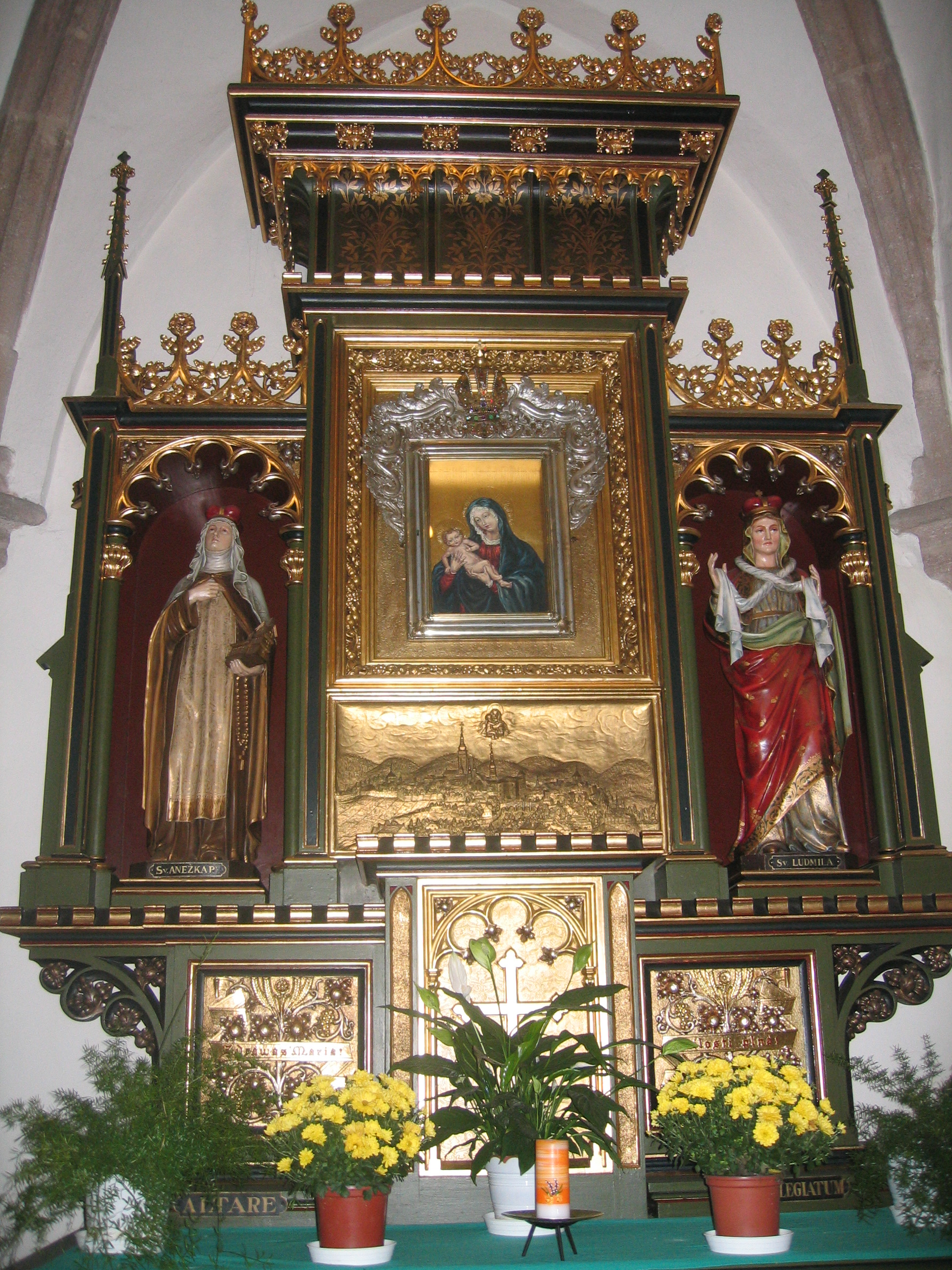
Altar of the Virgin Mary

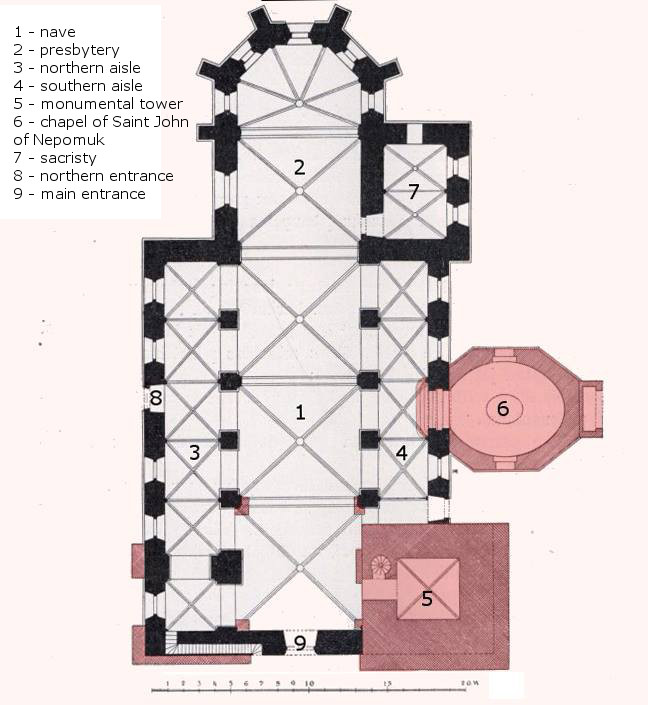
Church groundplan

== Curiosity ==
- The original main portal on the north side is quite unusual. Its origin may be due to the orientation of the church of East-West and dropping it to the highest point surrounded by walls. The church was in that place parallel to the walls and the best access road was straight from today's Alešovo Square to the north side of the church as could be clearly seen today.
- Throughout the history of the building were built entrance portals in all sides of the church. Even there was an entrance portal leading directly into the presbytery, which was bricked up in 2001. The southern entrance was bricked up two years earlier.
- The tower clock swapped size of pointers because of economic reasons. The big pointer shows hours and the small pointer shows minutes.

== Bibliography ==
- Soukup, Josef: Soupis památek Historických a uměleckých, díl 33. Politický okres písecký (1910), pp. 202–226.
- Adámek Jan, Sommer Jan; Všetečková Zuzana, Středověký kostel Panny Marie v Písku, Prácheňské nakladatelství firmy Ires (2001), 145 p. ISBN 80-86566-00-5
- Adámek Jan, Škoch Jiří, Písecké katolické kostely, Písek, Římskokatolická farnost Písek v Prácheňském nakladatelství (2005), 54 p. ISBN 80-86566-26-9
