= Antonín Václav Šourek =

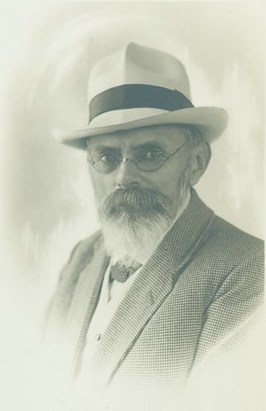
- Born: 3 June 1857; Písek, Bohemia, Austrian Empire
- Died: 20 February 1926 (aged 68); Sofia, Bulgaria
- Education: TU Wien, Czech Technical University in Prague
- Scientific career
- Fields: Mathematics
- Workplaces: Sofia University

Antonín Václav Šourek (3 June 1857 – 20 February 1926) was a Czech mathematician. He is noteworthy as one of the founders of modern mathematics in Bulgaria (which became modernized after the Treaty of San Stefano.)

== Life and career ==
Antonín Šourek was born on 3 June 1857 in Písek, Bohemia, Austrian Empire. He graduated in 1876 from a Realschule in Písek. From 1876 to 1878, he studied at TU Wien, where he attended lectures on mathematics, physics, and descriptive geometry. He was a student of Emil Weyr. Šourek then went to the Czech Technical University in Prague, where he furthered his knowledge of mathematics, physics, and descriptive geometry.

In 1880, he passed the examination certifying teaching competence in mathematics and descriptive geometry and went to Bulgaria. There in September 1880 he became a mathematics teacher at the Realschule in Sliven. A year later he was transferred from Sliven to Plovdiv. From there, in 1890, he moved to the Realschule in Sofia, where he was almost simultaneously appointed professor extraordinarius at Sofia University (founded in October 1888). In 1893 he resigned from the Realschule and completely transferred to Sofia University, where he was appointed professor ordinarius in 1898. From the years 1893 to 1902, while continuing his professorial duties at Sofia University, he lectured on descriptive geometry at a school for teacher training. He was an invited speaker at the International Congress of Mathematicians in 1904 at Heidelberg. Beginning in 1893 he also became a professor of descriptive geometry at the Military Academy in Sofia, where he taught for nine years. From 1895 to 1912 he lectured on perspective at the Academy of Painting in Sofia. In 1914 his bad health compelled him to resign his professorship at Sofia University and to move to Rome, where he became an unsalaried secretary of the military attaché. At the beginning of 1916 Šourek went to Bern, where he helped care for Bulgarian war prisoners. At the request of university administrators, after the end of World War I he returned to Sofia University and taught there from 1921 until his death in 1926. He died in Sofia on 20 February 1926.

Šourek wrote Bulgarian textbooks on plane trigonometry, solid geometry, analytic geometry, spherical trigonometry, and descriptive geometry. He published his Bulgarian mathematical lectures on projective geometry (1909), differential geometry (1911), analytical geometry (1912, 1914), and descriptive geometry (1914). Perhaps his two most important translations into Bulgarian are Alois Strnad's Geometrie pro vyšší třídy reálných gymnázií (Bulgarian title: Геометрия за висшите класове на реалните гимназии, Geometry for upper classes of state gymnasia) and Emanuel Taftl’s textbook Algebra pro vyšší třídy středních škol (Bulgarian title: Алгебра за горните класове на гимназиалните училища, Algebra for upper classes of secondary schools).

A. V. Šourek is also considered to be the founder of the Bulgarian terminology in descriptive geometry. Thanks to his good knowledge of Bulgarian and other languages (Czech, German, French, Italian), his deep knowledge of syntax, close cooperation with philologists and above all to his perfect knowledge of descriptive geometry itself, he developed a very successful system of the essential terms with wide possibilities of a more detailed evolution. Thanks to his method and prestige among the members of the Bulgarian community, most of his terms are used without any change or at most with only small modifications.
