= Ražice =

- Municipality
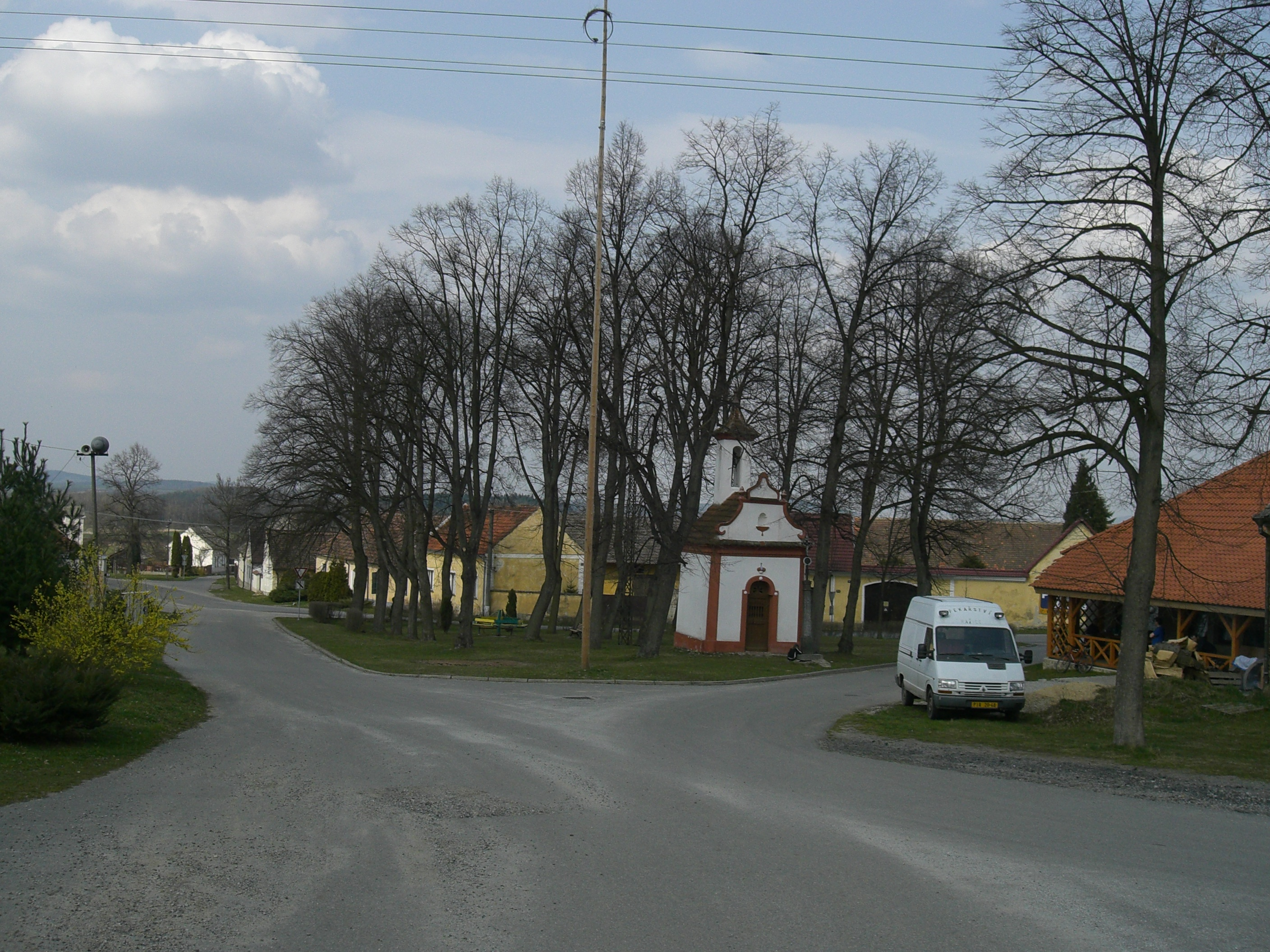
- Centre of Ražice

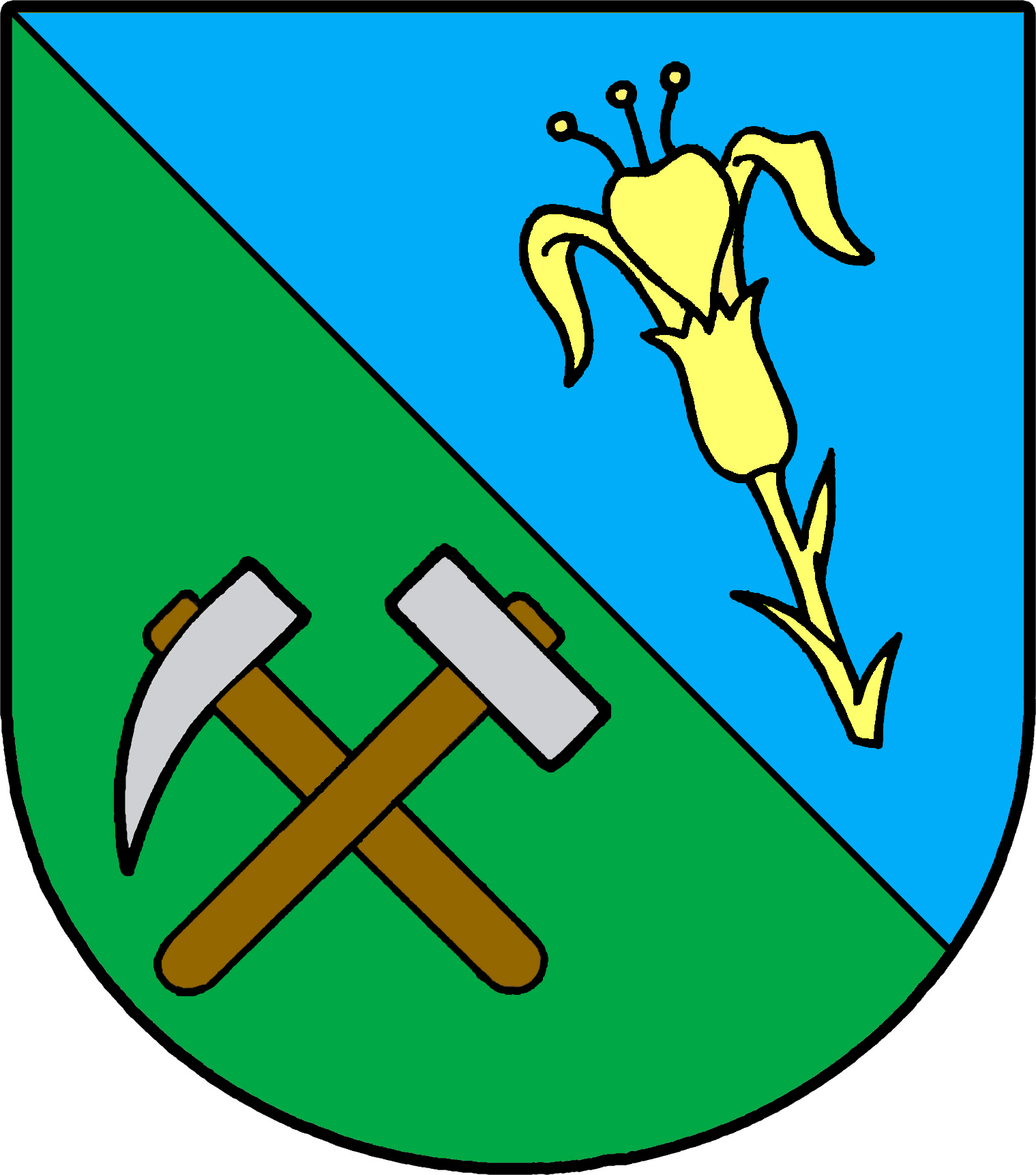
- Flag Coat of arms

- Location in the Czech Republic
- Coordinates: 49°14′28″N 14°6′6″E
- Country: Czech Republic
- Region: South Bohemian
- District: Písek
- First mentioned: 1469

Area
  - Total: 10.71 km^{2} (4.14 sq mi)
- Elevation: 386 m (1,266 ft)

Population (2026-01-01)
  - Total: 415
  - Density: 38.7/km^{2} (100/sq mi)
- Time zone: UTC+1 (CET)
  - Summer (DST): UTC+2 (CEST)
- Postal code: 398 22
- Website: www.razice.cz

Ražice is a municipality and village in Písek District in the South Bohemian Region of the Czech Republic. It has about 400 inhabitants.

Ražice lies approximately 7 kilometres (4 mi) south of Písek, 41 km (25 mi) north-west of České Budějovice, and 97 km (60 mi) south of Prague.

== Administrative division ==
Ražice consists of two municipal parts (in brackets population according to the 2021 census):

- Ražice (246)
- Štětice (149)

== Demographics ==
Historical population
Year	Pop.	±%
1869	593	—
1880	610	+2.9%
1890	691	+13.3%
1900	676	−2.2%
1910	708	+4.7%
1921	749	+5.8%
1930	720	−3.9%
1950	557	−22.6%
1961	585	+5.0%
1970	552	−5.6%
1980	531	−3.8%
1991	479	−9.8%
2001	415	−13.4%
2011	403	−2.9%
2021	395	−2.0%
Source: Censuses
