= Písek =

- Town
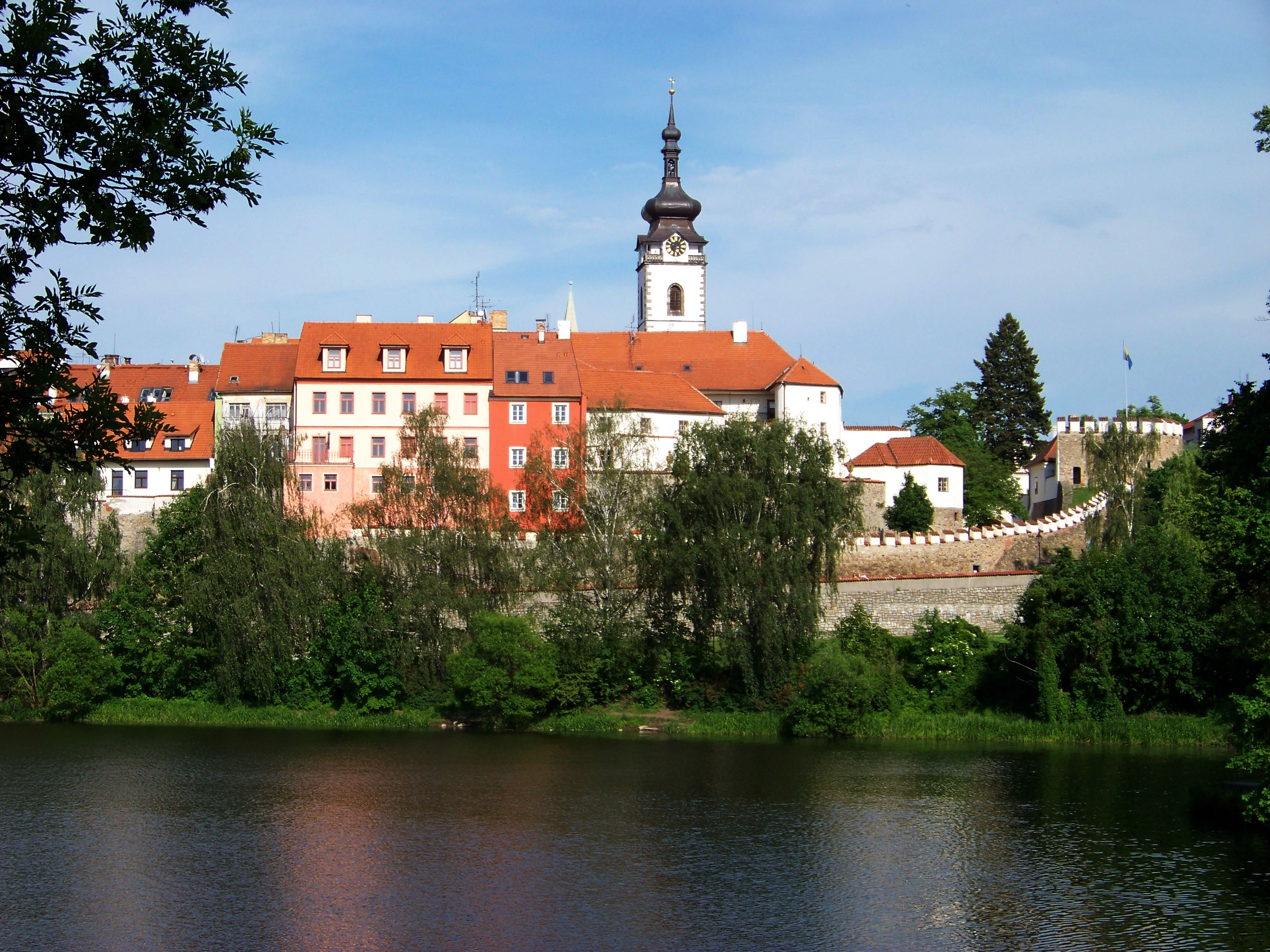
- Church of the Nativity of the Virgin Mary, town walls and the Otava

- Flag Coat of arms

- Location in the Czech Republic
- Coordinates: 49°18′32″N 14°8′51″E
- Country: Czech Republic
- Region: South Bohemian
- District: Písek
- Founded: 1254

Government
  - Mayor: Michal Čapek

Area
  - Total: 63.23 km^{2} (24.41 sq mi)
- Elevation: 378 m (1,240 ft)

Population (2026-01-01)
  - Total: 31,002
  - Density: 490.3/km^{2} (1,270/sq mi)
- Time zone: UTC+1 (CET)
  - Summer (DST): UTC+2 (CEST)
- Postal code: 397 01
- Website: www.mesto-pisek.cz

Písek (Czech pronunciation: [ˈpiːsɛk]; German: Pisek) is a town in the South Bohemian Region of the Czech Republic. It has about 31,000 inhabitants. The town is located on the Otava River. It is a centre of education with a number of important schools.

Písek was a village of gold panners, until the royal town was founded in 1254. Up to the last decades of 19th century, Písek was the centre of the large autonomous Prácheňsko region. The historic town centre is well preserved and is protected as an urban monument zone. The town is known for Písek Stone Bridge, the oldest bridge in the Czech Republic that is a national cultural monument.

== Administrative division ==
Písek consists of nine municipal parts (in brackets population according to the 2021 census):

- Budějovické Předměstí (18,219)
- Hradiště (2,016)
- Pražské Předměstí (5,577)
- Václavské Předměstí (1,589)
- Vnitřní Město (1,036)
- Nový Dvůr (110)
- Purkratice (47)
- Semice (425)
- Smrkovice (590)

The urban core is formed by Budějovické Předměstí, Hradiště, Pražské Předměstí, Václavské Předměstí and Vnitřní Město,

== Etymology ==
The name of Písek literally means 'sand' in Czech. It refers to the sand of the Otava River, which was panned for gold by the first settlers.

== Geography ==
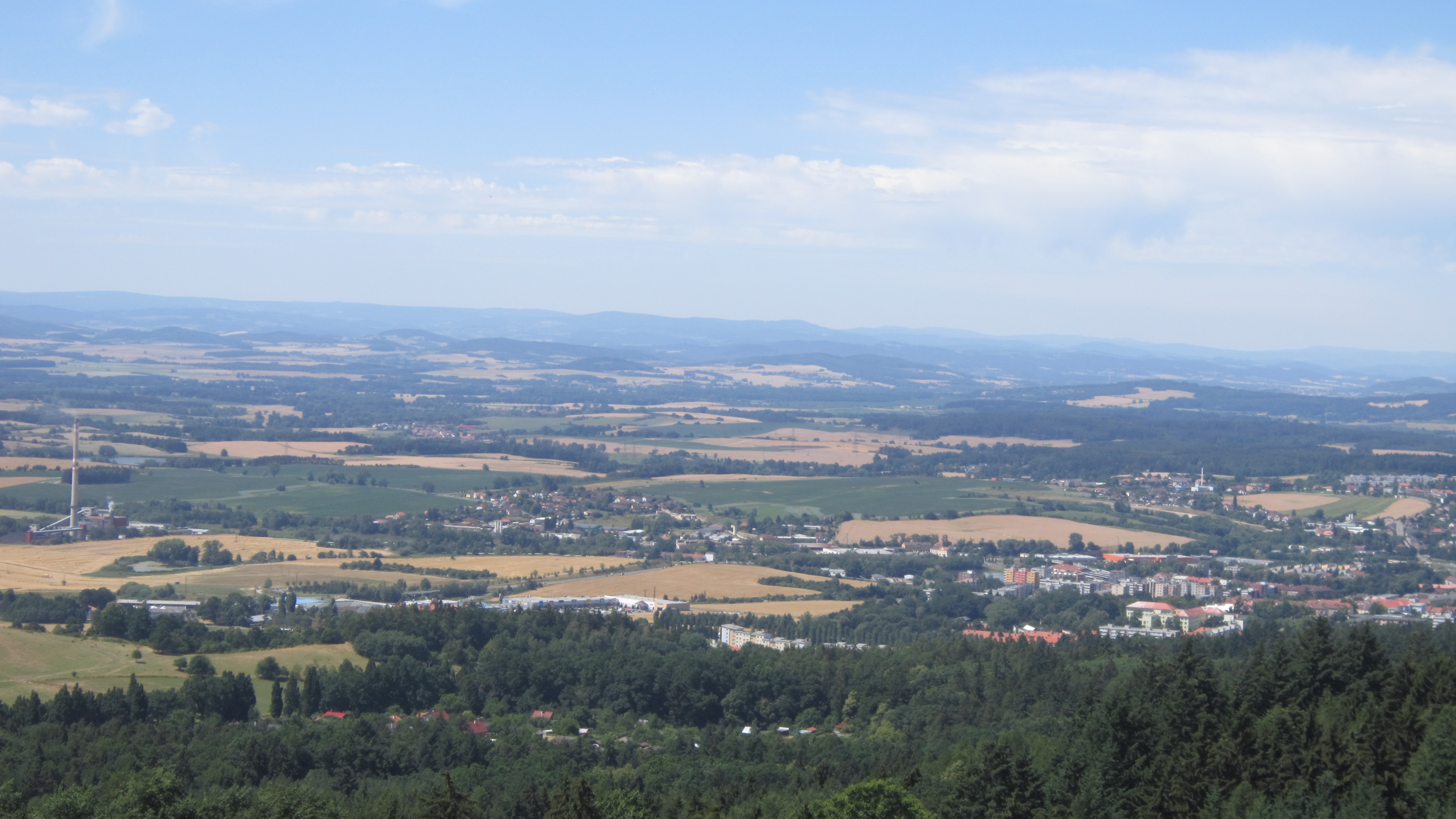
View of Písek from Jarník observation tower

Písek is located about 42 kilometres (26 mi) northwest of České Budějovice and 80 km (50 mi) south of Prague. Most of the municipal territory lies in the Tábor Uplands, but the southern part extends into the České Budějovice Basin. There are several steep streets, and some suburbs lie more than 70–90 metres above the town centre. The eastern part of the territory, known as the Písecké hory Nature Park, is covered by deciduous woodlands mixed with a high number of various coniferous trees. The highest point of Písek and the nature park is Velký Mehelník with an altitude of 633 metres (2,077 ft). The lowest point is located on the surface of the Otava at 350 m (1,150 ft).

The town is situated on both banks of the Otava River. There are several streams in the area, on which many fishponds have been built. The largest of the ponds are Prostřední Putim and Stará Putim.

=== Climate ===
Písek has a mild and dry microclimate because it is well-protected from all sides against winds. Písek enjoys a cool inland version of a humid continental climate (Dfb) with rather balanced temperatures year round and rare deep negative extremes. The annual precipitation is 710 millimetres (28 in).

Climate data for Písek
Month	Jan	Feb	Mar	Apr	May	Jun	Jul	Aug	Sep	Oct	Nov	Dec	Year
Mean daily maximum °C (°F)	2.0 (35.6)	3.8 (38.8)	8.4 (47.1)	14.0 (57.2)	18.0 (64.4)	21.4 (70.5)	23.2 (73.8)	23.1 (73.6)	18.4 (65.1)	13.4 (56.1)	7.5 (45.5)	3.3 (37.9)	13 (55)
Daily mean °C (°F)	−0.9 (30.4)	0.0 (32.0)	3.8 (38.8)	9.0 (48.2)	13.5 (56.3)	17.1 (62.8)	18.8 (65.8)	18.6 (65.5)	14.1 (57.4)	9.3 (48.7)	4.3 (39.7)	0.6 (33.1)	9.0 (48.2)
Mean daily minimum °C (°F)	−3.8 (25.2)	−3.5 (25.7)	−0.6 (30.9)	3.7 (38.7)	8.3 (46.9)	12.1 (53.8)	13.9 (57.0)	13.7 (56.7)	9.8 (49.6)	5.5 (41.9)	1.4 (34.5)	−2.0 (28.4)	4.9 (40.8)
Average precipitation mm (inches)	45 (1.8)	36 (1.4)	53 (2.1)	47 (1.9)	73 (2.9)	82 (3.2)	89 (3.5)	79 (3.1)	62 (2.4)	50 (2.0)	48 (1.9)	46 (1.8)	710 (28.0)
Source: Climate-Data.org

== History ==
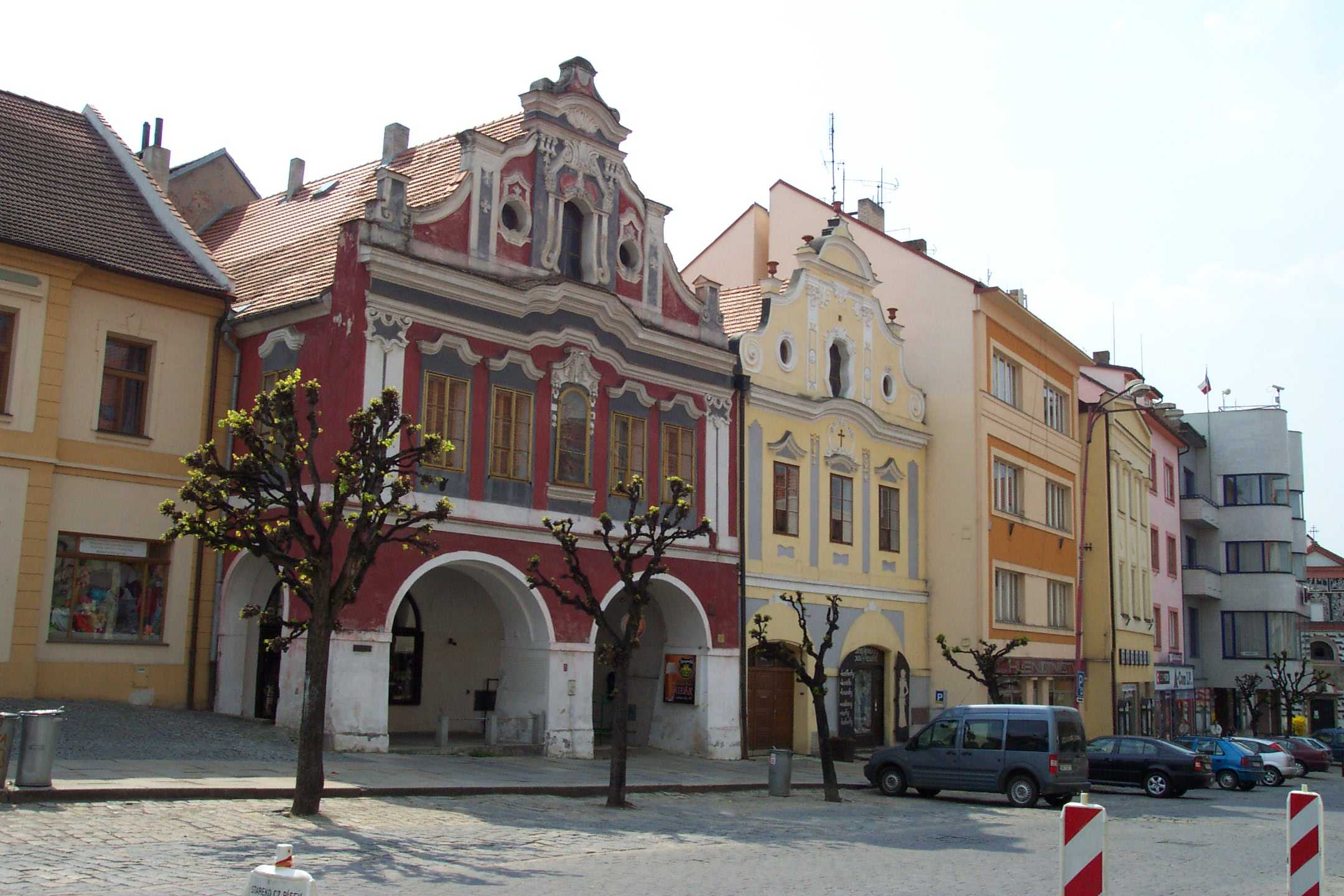
Old houses in the town centre

The predecessor of the town was a settlement of the area where gold was panned, which later became a market village with the royal court. In 1254, King Ottokar II founded a royal town here. During his reign, the town grew and its importance increased. A castle was built above the ford across the Otava River, a monastery was founded, and Písek Stone Bridge was built. Also, at the end of the 13th century, the mint was founded, later moved to Kutná Hora.

From 1308, Písek was a free imperial town, and in the 14th century became the administrative centre of Prácheňsko region. Under the rule of Charles IV, the salt and grain warehouses were founded, and were the largest in Bohemia. For centuries, the town of Písek was the holder of the largest urban estate in Bohemia, especially forests.

During the Hussite Wars, Písek was conquered by the Hussites and the monastery was razed. During the Thirty Years' War, in 1619–1620 the town was conquered and most of its inhabitants killed by the army of Charles de Longueval, Count of Bucquoy. In 1623, Písek was acquired by the royal chamber again, and in 1641, it was once again promoted to a royal town. In the 18th century, it became the centre of Prácheňsko again.

In the 19th century, Písek became the centre of education because several schools of higher education were established here.

== Demographics ==
Historical population

Year	Pop.	±%
1869	10,565	—
1880	12,156	+15.1%
1890	12,550	+3.2%
1900	15,313	+22.0%
1910	17,273	+12.8%

Year	Pop.	±%
1921	18,094	+4.8%
1930	18,658	+3.1%
1950	20,560	+10.2%
1961	21,228	+3.2%
1970	23,713	+11.7%

Year	Pop.	±%
1980	28,104	+18.5%
1991	29,550	+5.1%
2001	29,796	+0.8%
2011	29,706	−0.3%
2021	29,609	−0.3%

Source: Censuses

== Economy ==
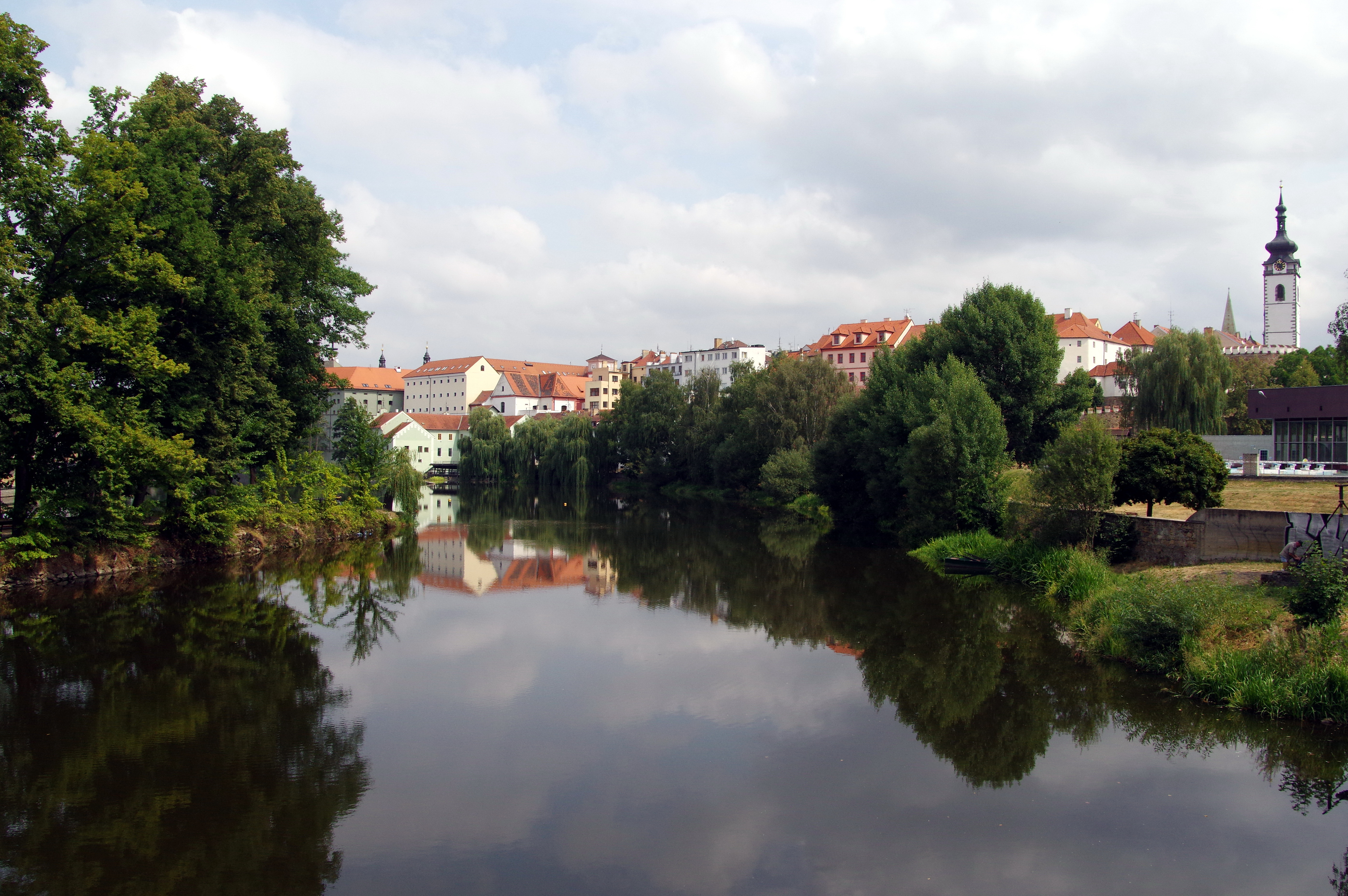
Otava river in Písek

There is the Industrial Zone Sever in Pražské Předměstí part of Písek. The largest industrial employers in Písek are S.N.O.P. CZ, Aisin Europe Manufacturing Czech, and Faurecia Components Písek, all three engaged in the production of automotive parts. Another large employer is the Písek Hospital.

== Transport ==
Písek is connected by the D4 motorway to Prague and by the I/20 and I/29 roads. The I/20 travels northwest to Plzeň and southeast to České Budějovice, while the I/29 travels east to Tábor.

The Písek railway station lies on the Zdice–Protivín and Tábor–Ražice rail lines.

== Education ==
Písek is colloquially called "South Bohemian Athens" because it has many high schools and schools of higher education, including the Film School in Písek.

== Culture ==
Since 2007, there has been a tradition of creating and exhibiting giant sand sculptures on the waterfront of the Otava River in the summer. Each year a different theme is chosen for the sculptures.

== Sights ==
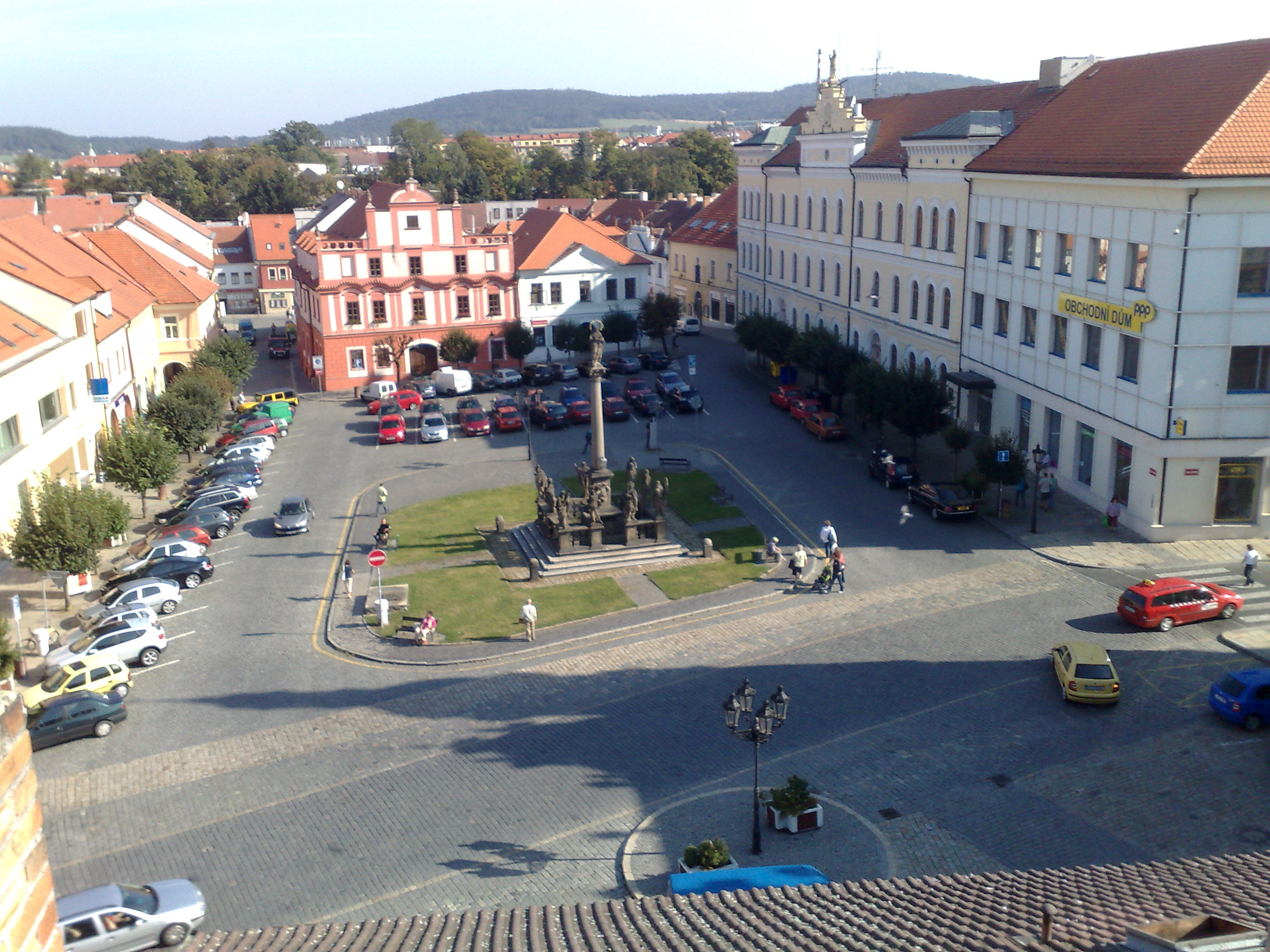
Marian column on Alšovo náměstí

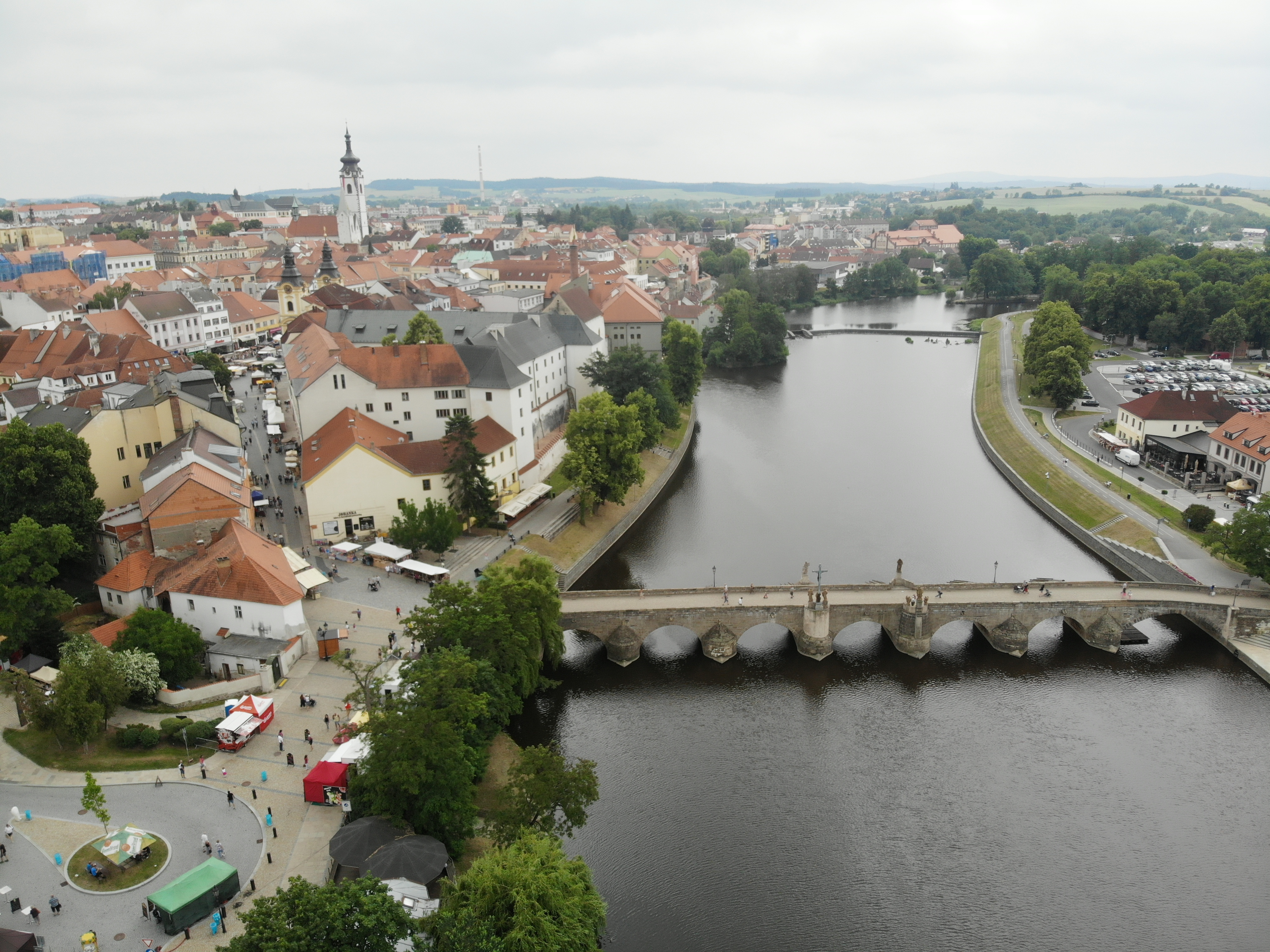
Písek Stone Bridge

Písek has a well-preserved, medieval centre formed by the larger square Velké náměstí and smaller square Alšovo náměstí with a number of narrow alleys. The most valuable monument is Písek Stone Bridge, protected as a national cultural monument. It was the second stone bridge in Bohemia and it is the oldest preserved bridge in country. It is also one of the oldest preserved bridges in whole Europe.

=== Sacral buildings ===
There are six churches in Písek, four of them in the town centre. One of the town's main landmarks is the Deanery Church of the Nativity of the Virgin Mary from the mid-13th century, old as the town itself. The church tower is open to the public and serves as a lookout tower.

The Church of the Exaltation of the Holy Cross, located on the central square, commemorates the former Dominican Monastery destroyed by the Hussites in 1419.

The Church of Saint Wenceslaus is located in Václavské Předměstí part of Písek. Existence of a sacral building in the area was documented in around 1200; Church of Saint Wenceslaus was first mentioned in 1378. The original church was demolished in the mid-16th century and a new Gothic-Renaissance church was built on its foundations. In 1695–1697, it was rebuilt into the Baroque style. Today it is known for the unique fresco of Jan Hus being burned in Konstanz from around 1550, the oldest painting of his burning in the world.

=== Castle and town walls ===
The Písek Castle is a partly preserved Gothic castle, rebuilt into the town hall and a brewery. It also houses the Prácheňsko Museum; part of its exhibition is a preserved Gothic hall from the 13th century.

There are several preserved remains of the town fortifications in Písek, including two castle bastions and fragments of the town walls.

== Notable people ==
- Adolf Heyduk (1835–1923), poet
- August Sedláček (1843–1926), historian
- Otakar Ševčík (1852–1934), violinist
- Josef Holeček (1853–1929), writer
- Antonín Václav Šourek (1857–1926), mathematician
- Fráňa Šrámek (1877–1952), writer and poet
- Josef Chochol (1880–1956), architect
- Jan Mukařovský (1891–1975), literature theorist
- John Juzek (1892 – c. 1965), merchant
- Ferdinand Hart (1893–1937), actor
- George Mraz (born 1944), bassist
- Kateřina Neumannová (born 1973), cross-country skier
- Tomáš Zíb (born 1976), tennis player
- Tomáš Verner (born 1986), figure skater
- Jan Rutta (born 1990), ice hockey player

== Twin towns – sister cities ==
Písek is twinned with:

- Caerphilly, Wales, United Kingdom
- Deggendorf, Germany
- Lemvig, Denmark
- Smiltene, Latvia
- Veľký Krtíš, Slovakia
- Wetzlar, Germany

Písek also has friendly relations with Jičín in the Czech Republic and Bad Leonfelden in Austria.
