= Czech Gothic architecture =

Architectural period

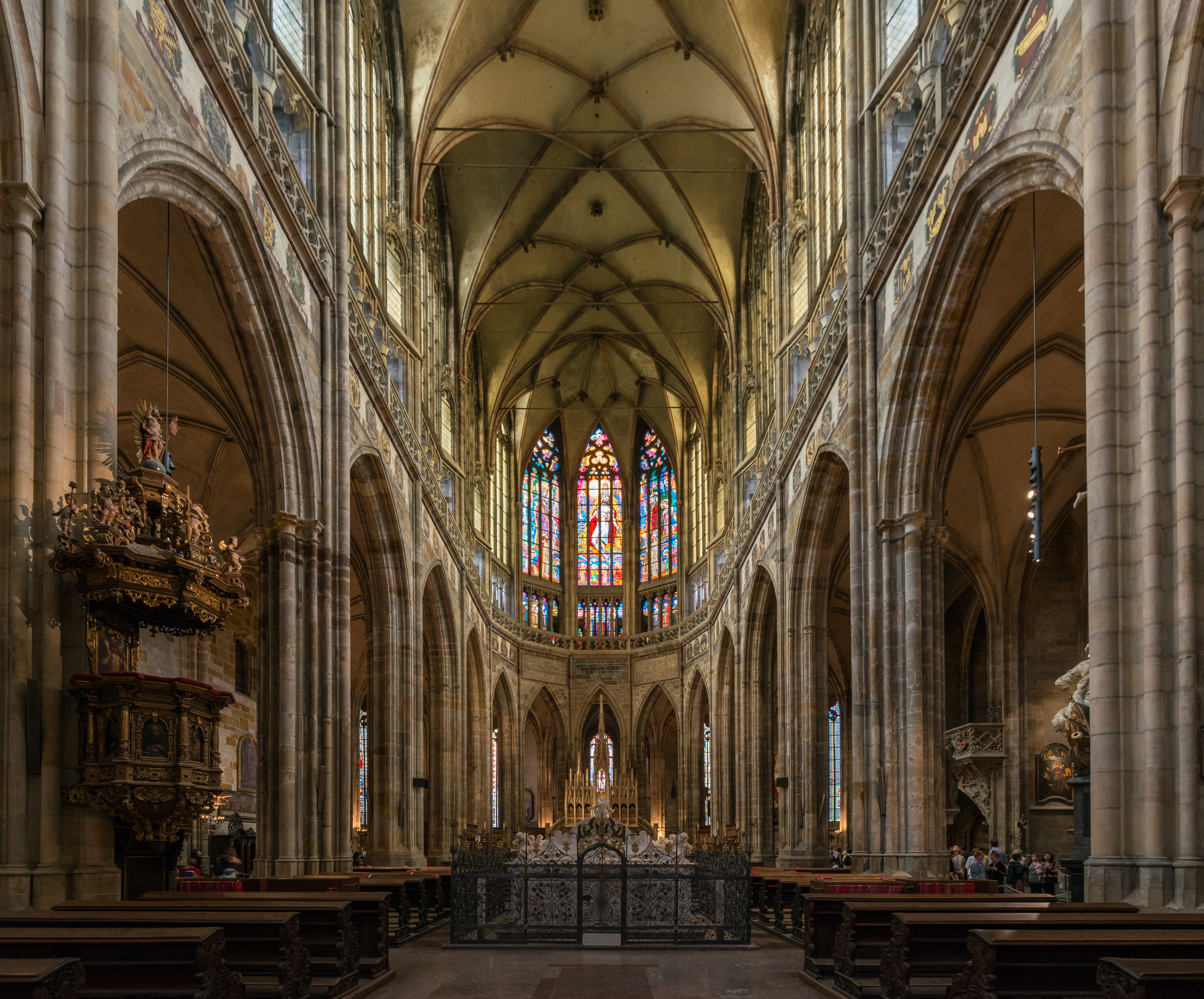
Choir of St. Vitus Cathedral in Prague built by Matthias of Arras and Peter Parler in 1344–1385

Czech Gothic architecture refers to the architectural period primarily of the Late Middle Ages in the area of the present-day Czech Republic (former Crown of Bohemia, primarily consisting of the Kingdom of Bohemia and Margraviate of Moravia).

The Gothic style first appeared in the Czech lands in the first half of the 13th century and was common there until the early 16th century. The phases of the development of the Gothic architecture in the Czech lands are often named after the Bohemian ruling dynasty of the corresponding time:

- Early Gothic – Přemyslid Gothic (13th and early 14th century)
- High Gothic – Luxembourg Gothic (14th and early 15th century)
- Late Gothic – Jagiellonian Gothic (approximately 1471–1526)

The most significant Gothic architects who worked in the Czech lands (especially in Bohemia) were Peter Parler and Benedikt Ried.

== Early Gothic ==
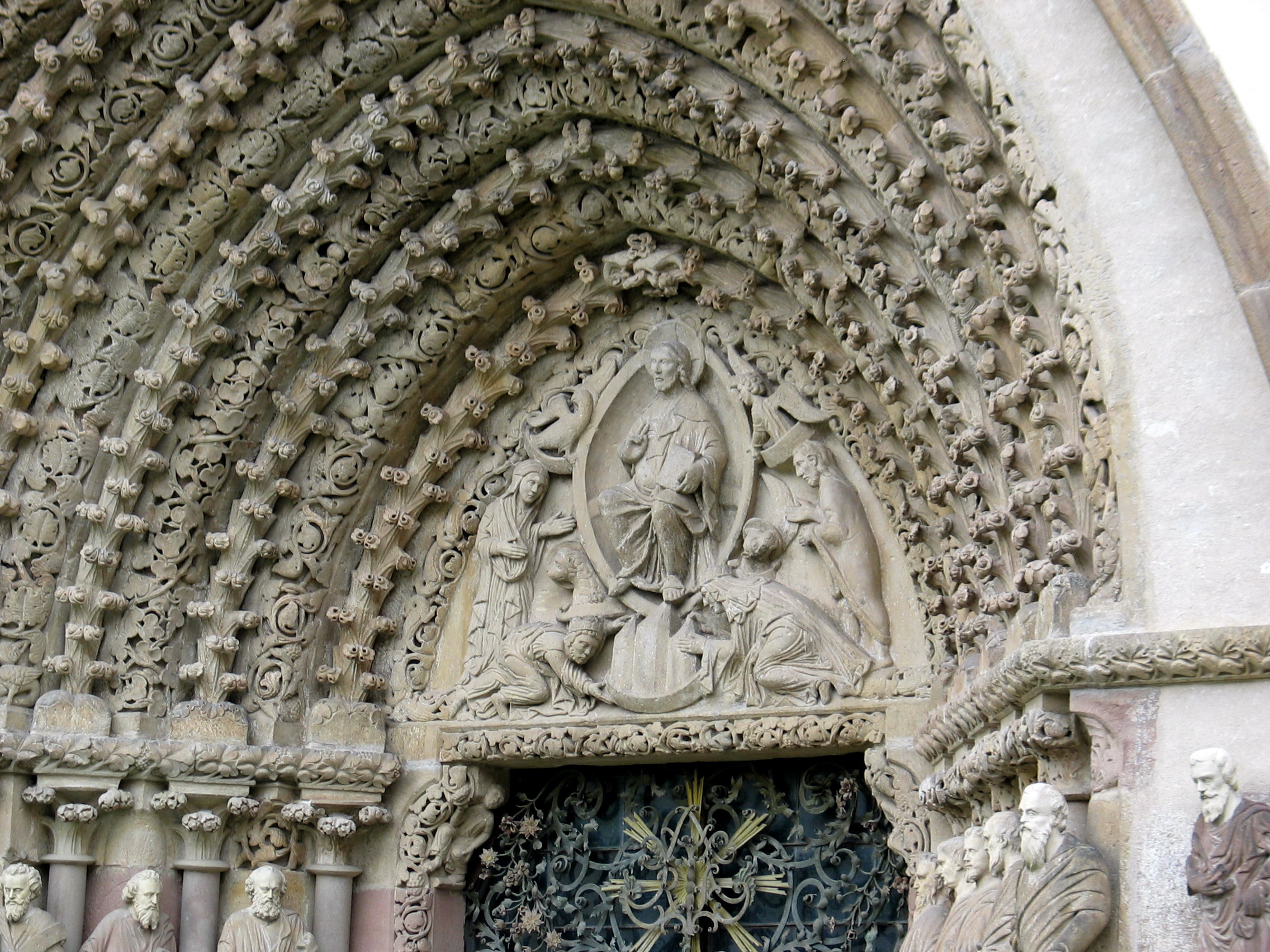
Portal of the church of Porta coeli Convent in Tišnov near Brno, Moravia, 1230s.

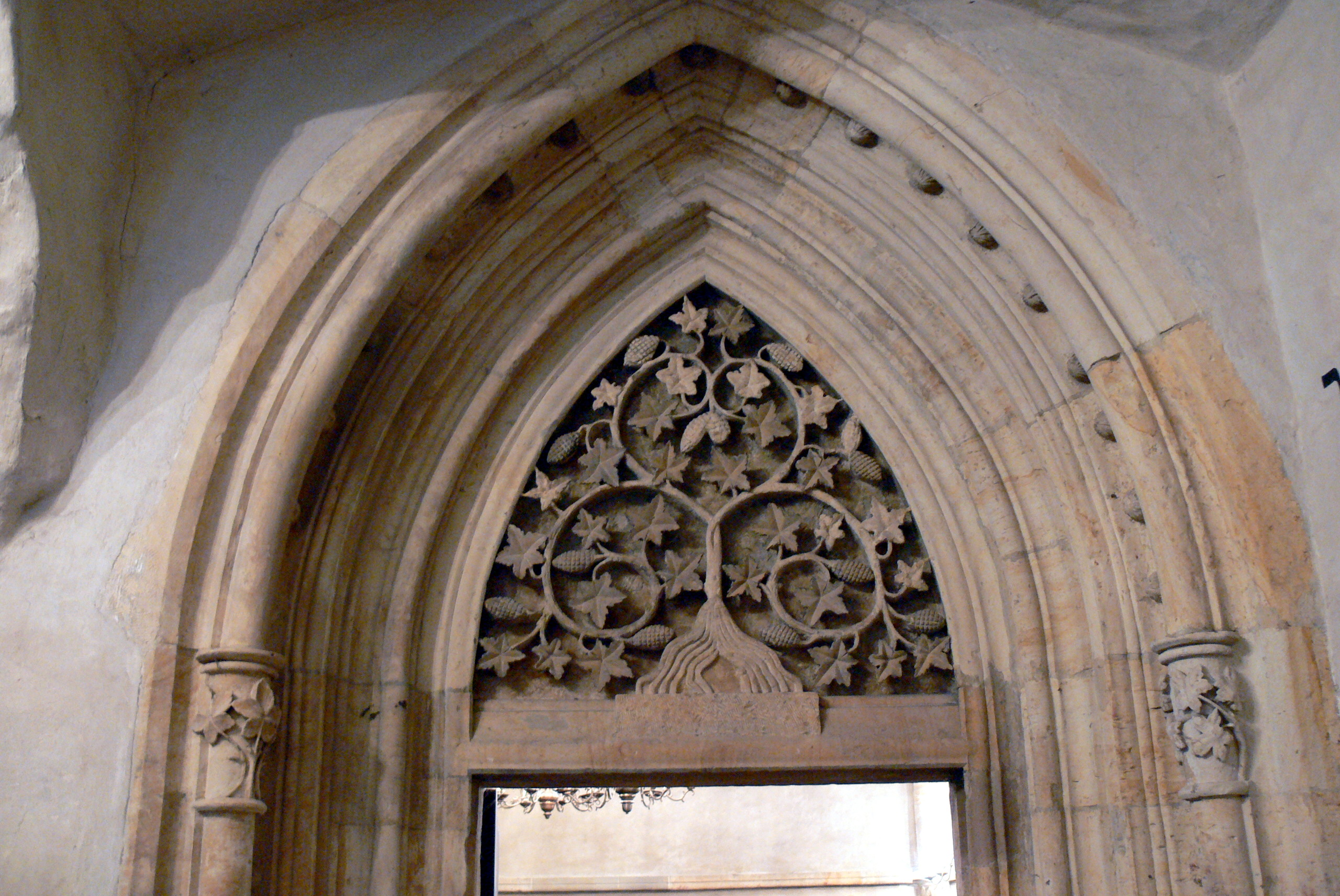
Portal of the Old New Synagogue in Prague using vine-leaf motifs, after 1270.

The Gothic style penetrated the Czech lands in the first half of the 13th century – in the time when the Romanesque style flourished in Bohemia and the High Gothic in France. In the 13th century the Kingdom of Bohemia became a stable country and the growth of the political and economical importance of Bohemia mirrored also in the art. Until that time the cultural development of the Czech lands was obviously delayed in comparison with Western Europe. In the 13th century many monasteries, convents, cities, towns and villages were founded. It was the time of colonization of the still uninhabited areas of the Kingdom. The Czech nobility accepted the culture of knights, so they listened to the German Minnesingers, participated in tournaments, got their coat of arms and built castles of stone. Thanks to the newly found silver mines the Kingdom was becoming richer (e. g. Jihlava, Stříbro or Kutná Hora).

In the 1240s, the last purely Romanesque churches were built (e.g. in Vinec, Potvorov, Tismice and Kondrac). In the 1230s, the first early Gothic buildings were built in the "transitional" style brought to Bohemia and Moravia by the Cistercians. Their buildings were not very fancy and they often used leaf and berry motifs, especially on the capitals. The Cistercians were the most important builders of the very early Gothic style architecture in the Czech lands.

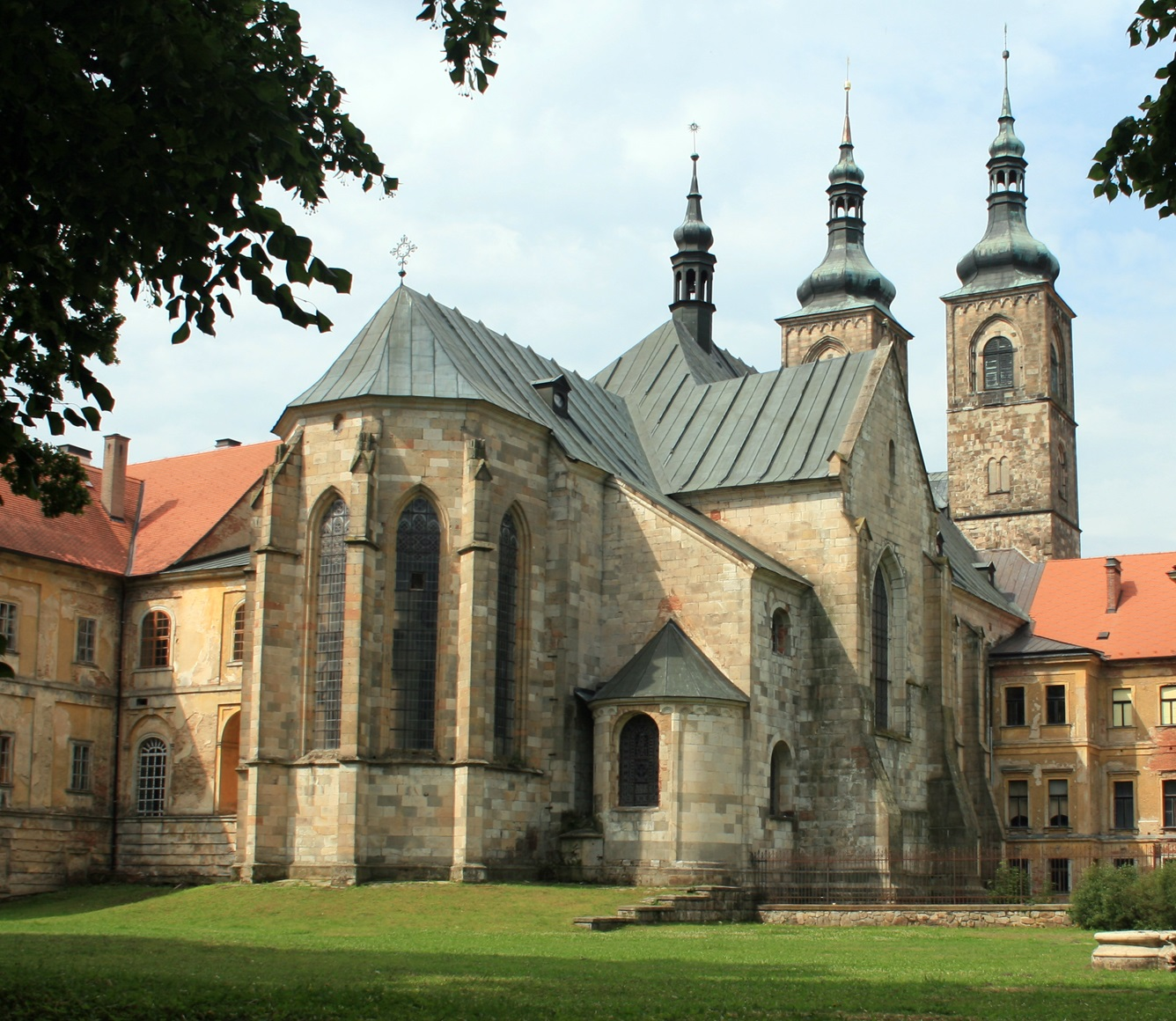
Teplá Abbey Church, Bohemia, consecrated in 1232

The Church of Teplá Abbey (Premonstratensians) consecrated in 1232 is one of the oldest Gothic churches in Bohemia. Other important early Gothic building is the Osek Monastery (Cistercians) in Bohemia with its unique Chapter hall. The first Gothic building in Moravia was the Monastery of Cistercian nuns Porta Coeli in Předklášteří u Tišnova near Brno founded by Constance of Hungary, Queen of Bohemia in 1233 and concentrated in 1239. There are the oldest traceries of the rose windows in the Czech lands and the very fancy portal built in the style of the French cathedrals was unique in Central Europe of that time.

The St. Procopius Basilica in Třebíč is considered to be the most bizarre work of the European architecture of the second third of the 13th century. The architecture of this former Benedictine abbey church in Třebíč is a unique mixture of Romanesque and Gothic style. It was not built in the "transitional" Romanesque-Gothic style but the builders used elements of the both styles in its mature forms and so created a building which is purely Romanesque and Gothic at the same time. Therefore, it is listed in the UNESCO World Heritage List.

The oldest Gothic building in Prague is the Convent of St. Agnes founded in 1231 by the Bohemian Princess Agnes of Bohemia (later canonized). It was the first convent of the Poor Clares outside Italy. The first church of this convent (St. Francis Church) was completed in 1234 and it is said to be the oldest vaulted mendicant order church north of the Alps. The Church of Christ the Saviour built in 1261–1265 as the royal mausoleum of Přemyslid dynasty by King Ottokar II of Bohemia was directly influenced by the French Gothic architecture.

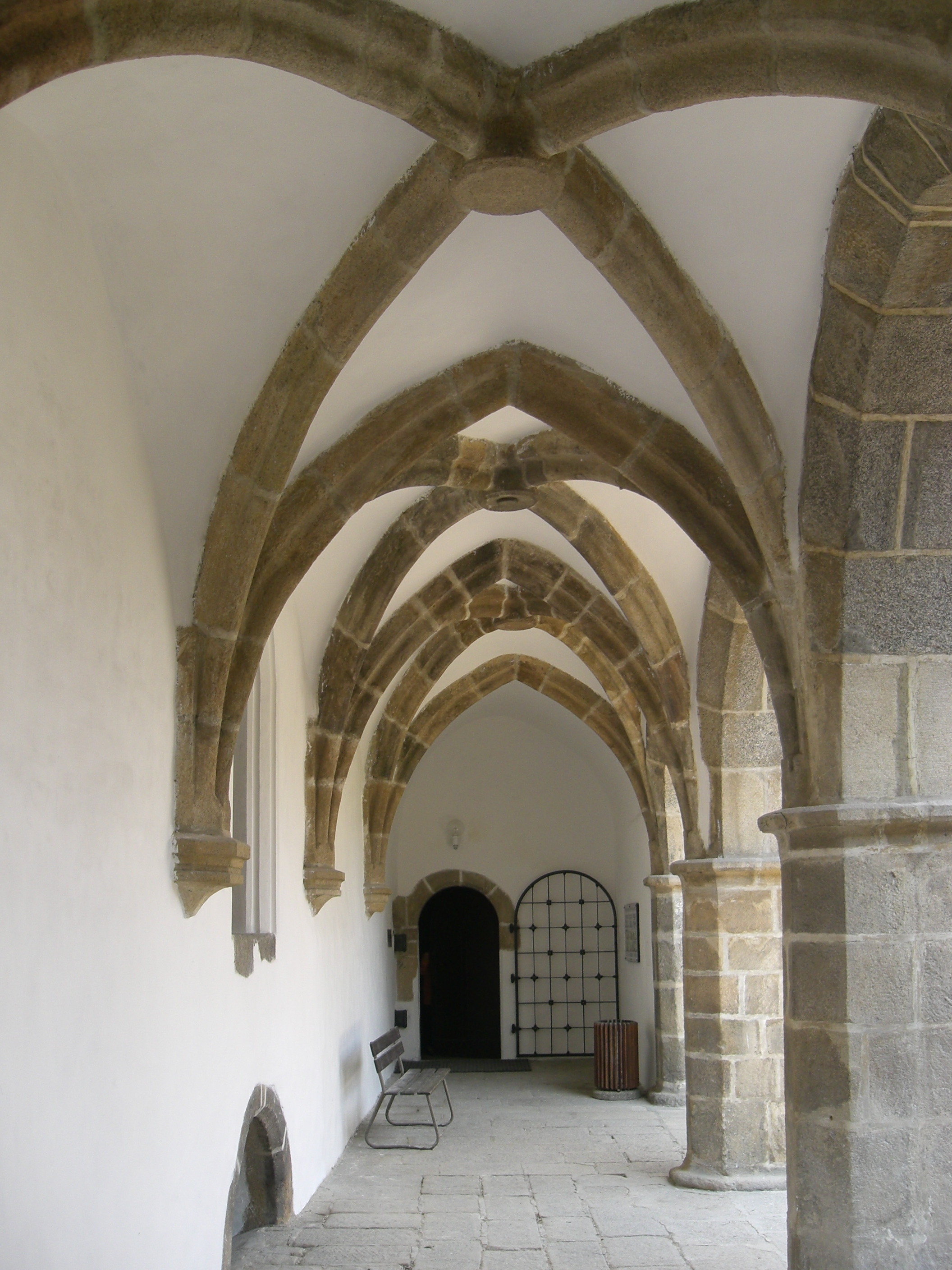
Arcades of Royal Castle in Písek form the second half of the 13th century

In the new-founded rich mining town Jihlava there were built three early Gothic churches (parish, Minorite and Dominicane) in the 1240s which also belong to the oldest preserved Gothic churches in the Czech lands.

After the 1260s the influence of the Cistercian style diminished and the Czech architecture was then inspired by the French High Gothic architecture. In southern Bohemia there worked the royal builders employed by the King Ottokar II of Bohemia. In the Royal Town of Písek there they built some important buildings (Royal Castle, Písek Stone Bridge, parish church). They also built the Zvíkov Castle with a central court surrounded by arcades in two levels inspired by the cloister – typical element of the monastic architecture. The chapel of the castle was completed in 1270.

Other important castles are the royal Bezděz Castle (with its beautiful chapel) and Křivoklát Castle, the bishop's Horšovský Týn Castle (its chapel has been preserved, other parts were later rebuilt). In Moravia there are the Špilberk Castle in Brno, Veveří Castle, Buchlov, Hukvaldy or others.

The Old New Synagogue in the Jewish Quarter of the Old Town of Prague was built around 1270 by stonemasons of the royal workshop who also built the Convent of St. Agnes. This twin-nave synagogue is one of the oldest preserved in Europe and the oldest still active in Europe.

The style of the Old New Synagogue resembles the Cistercian monasteries Zlatá Koruna (founded in 1263) and Vyšší Brod (founded in 1259). In Vyšší Brod very precious early Gothic Chapter hall from 1285 has been preserved. These monasteries were then completed in the High Gothic style.

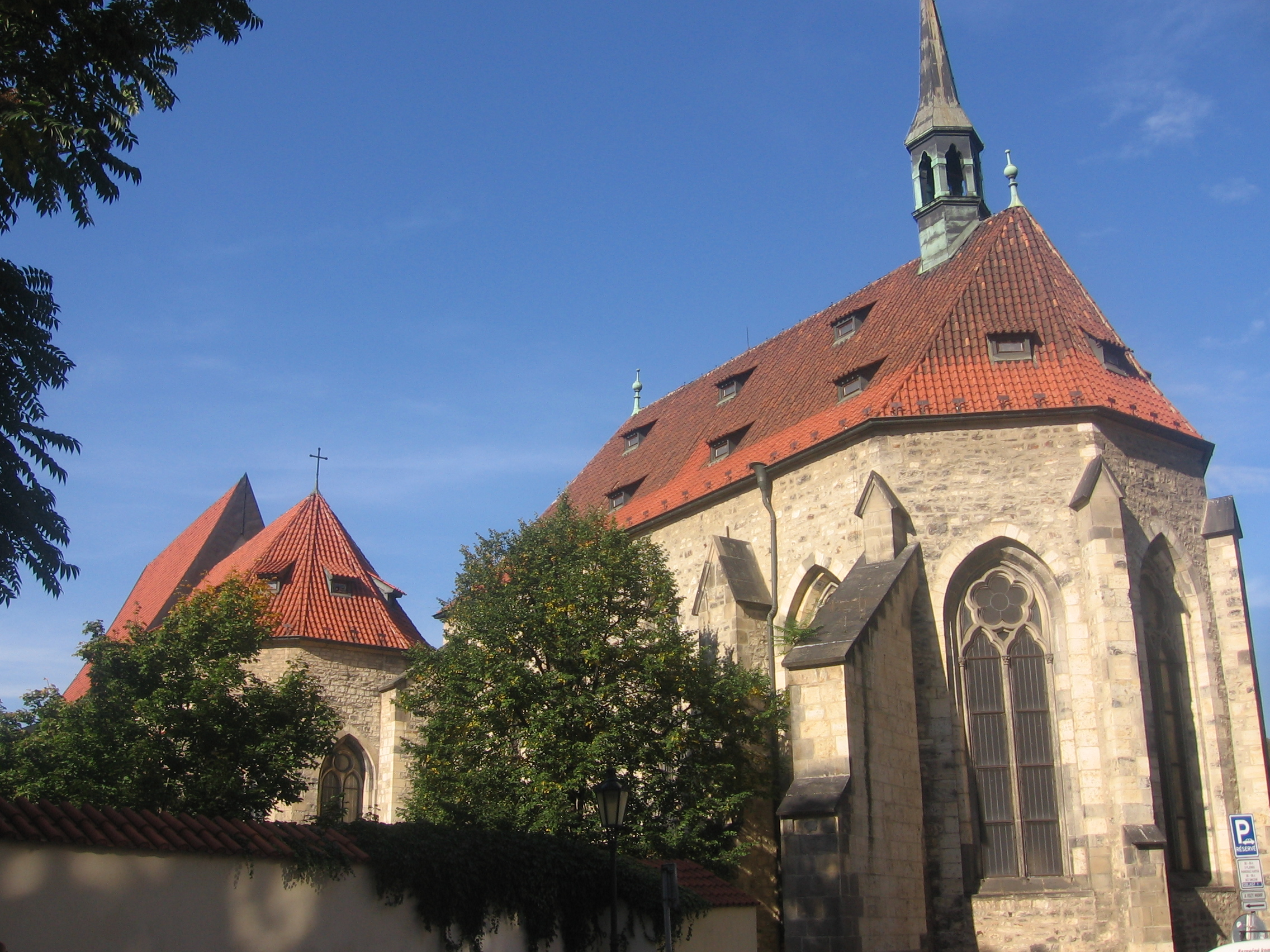
Convent of St. Agnes of Bohemia in Prague, 1230s–1270s

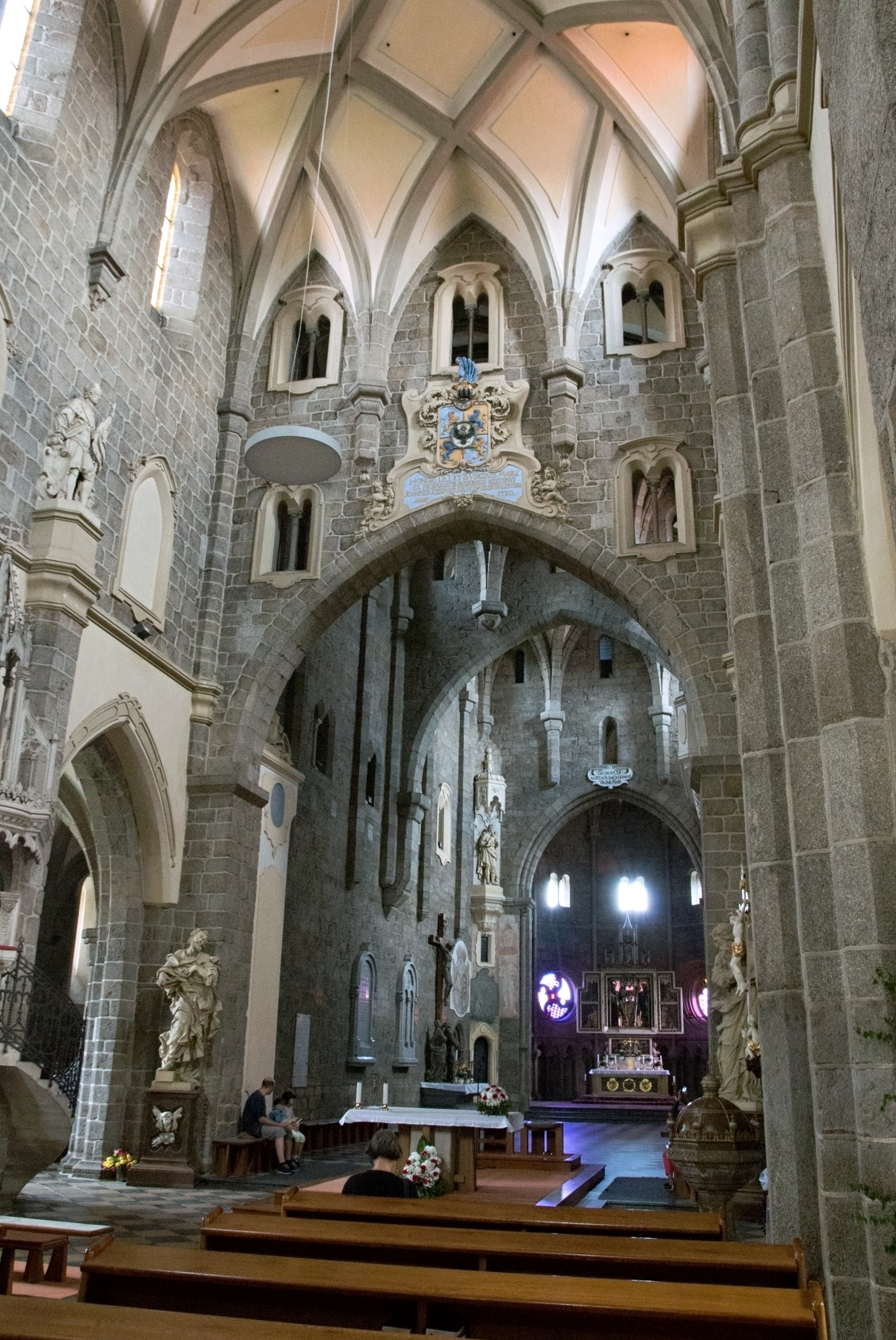
Interior of St. Procopius Basilica in Třebíč from the 1240s and 1250s

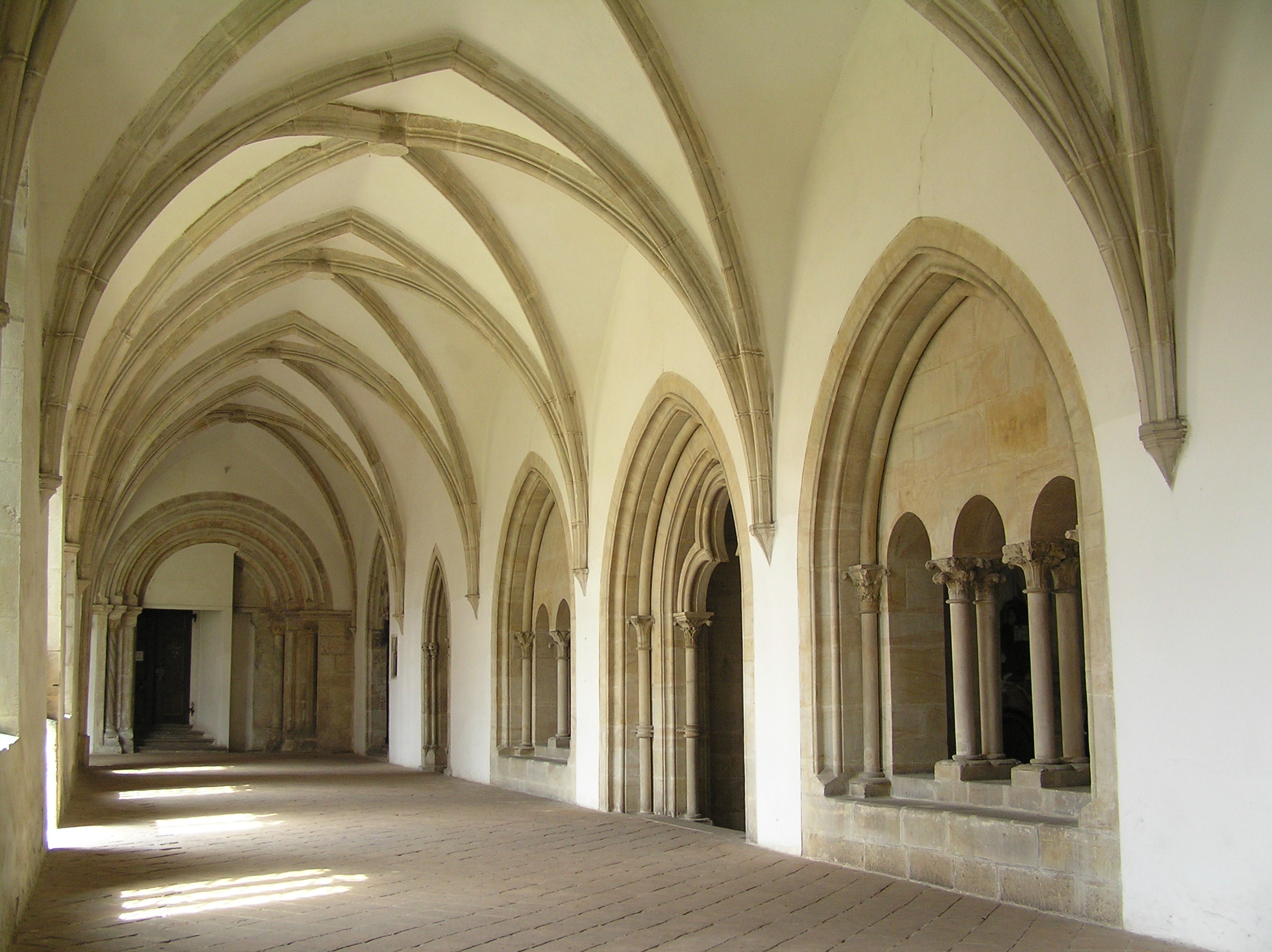
Osek Monastery, before 1240

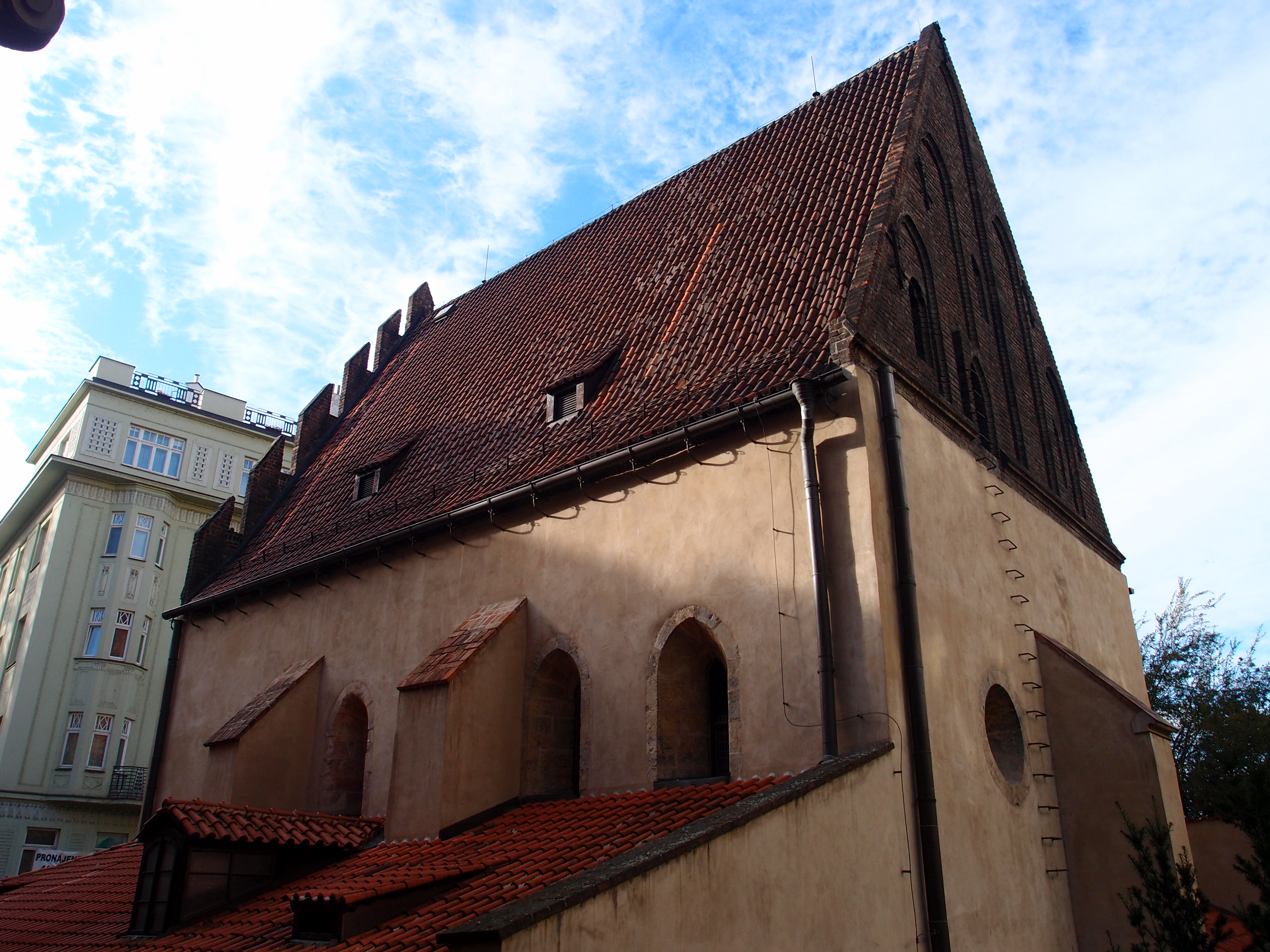
Old-New Synagogue in Prague, after 1270

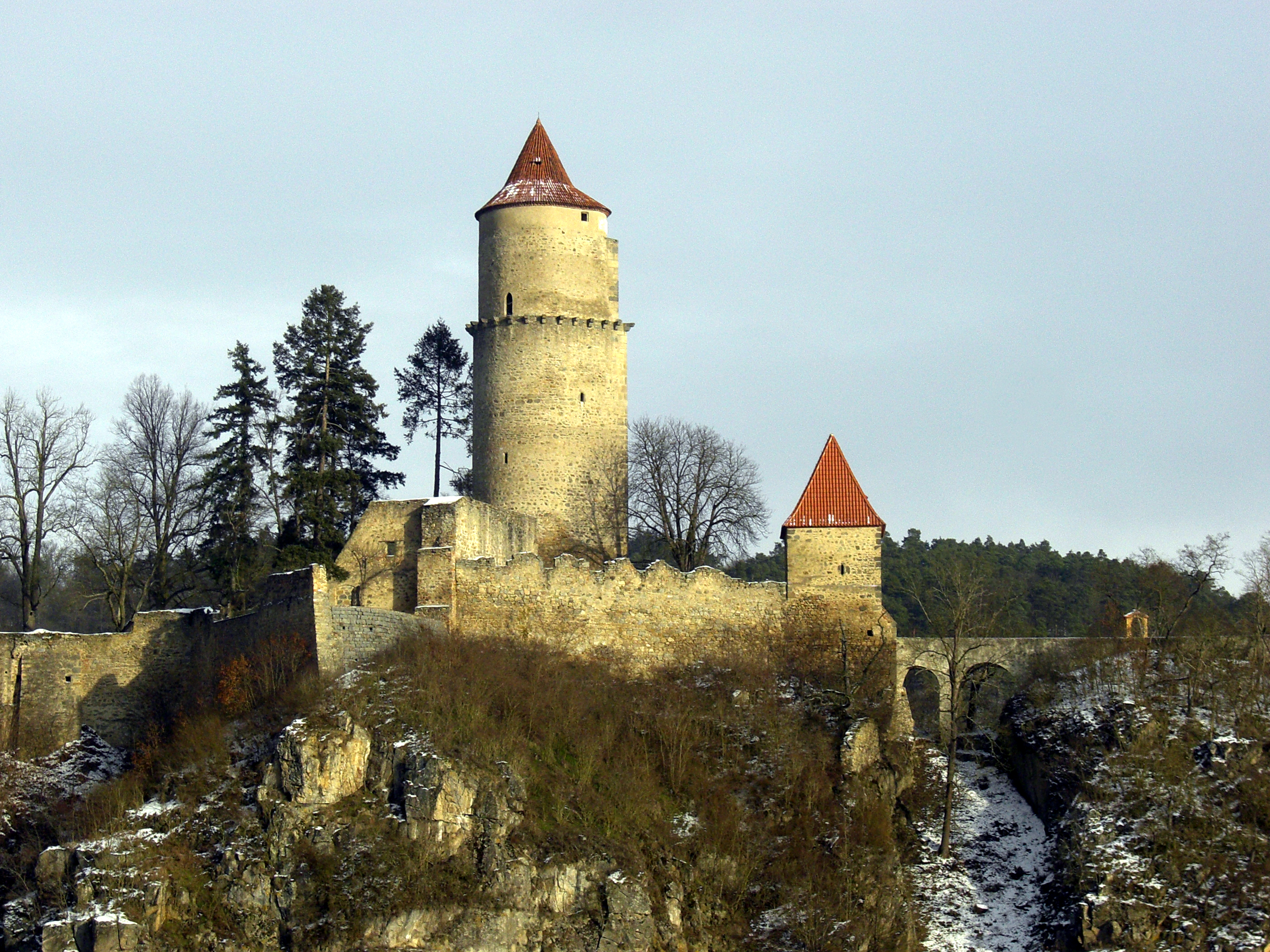
Zvíkov Castle in Bohemia, before 1270

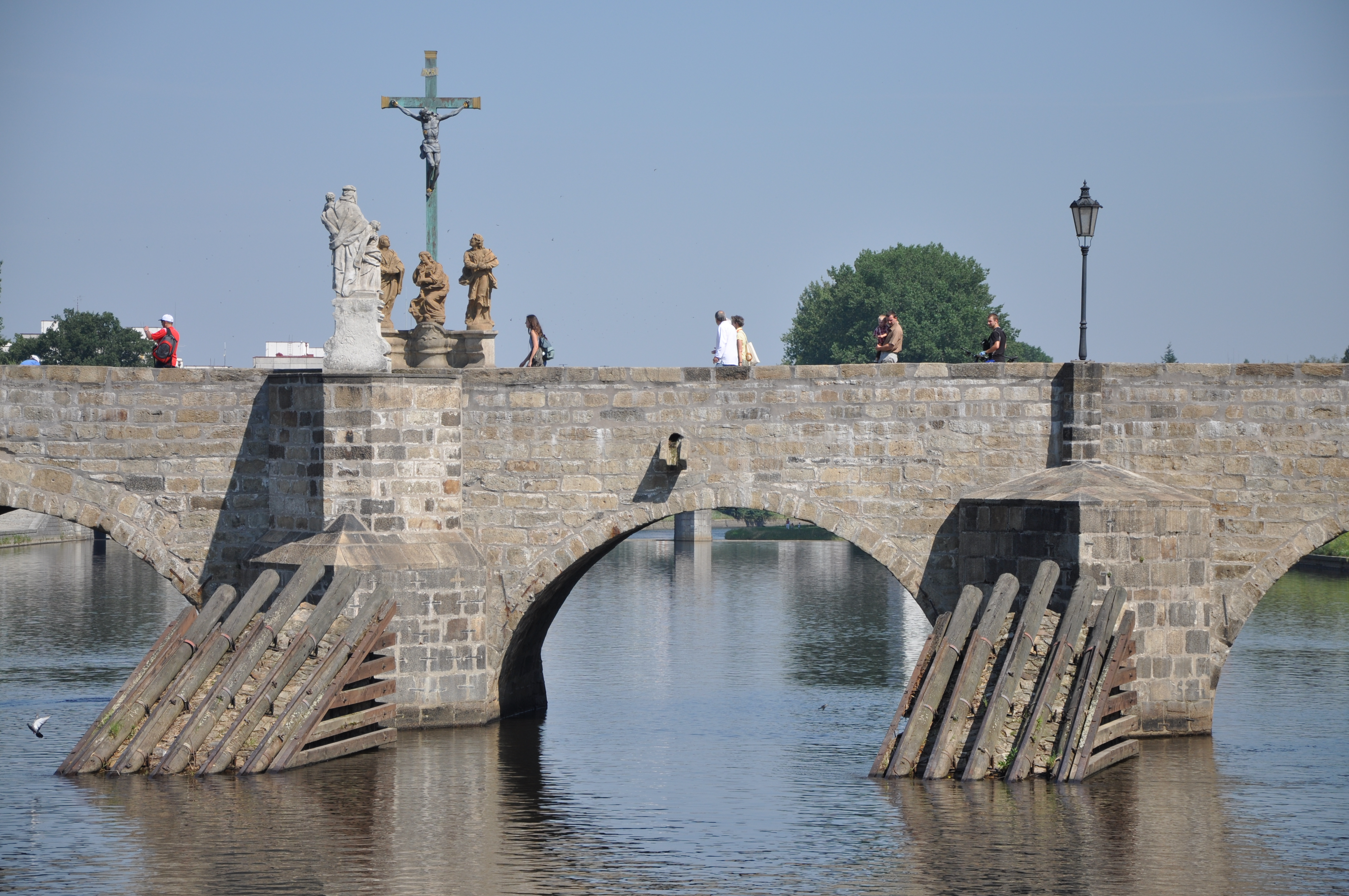
Písek Stone Bridge, 1263–1265

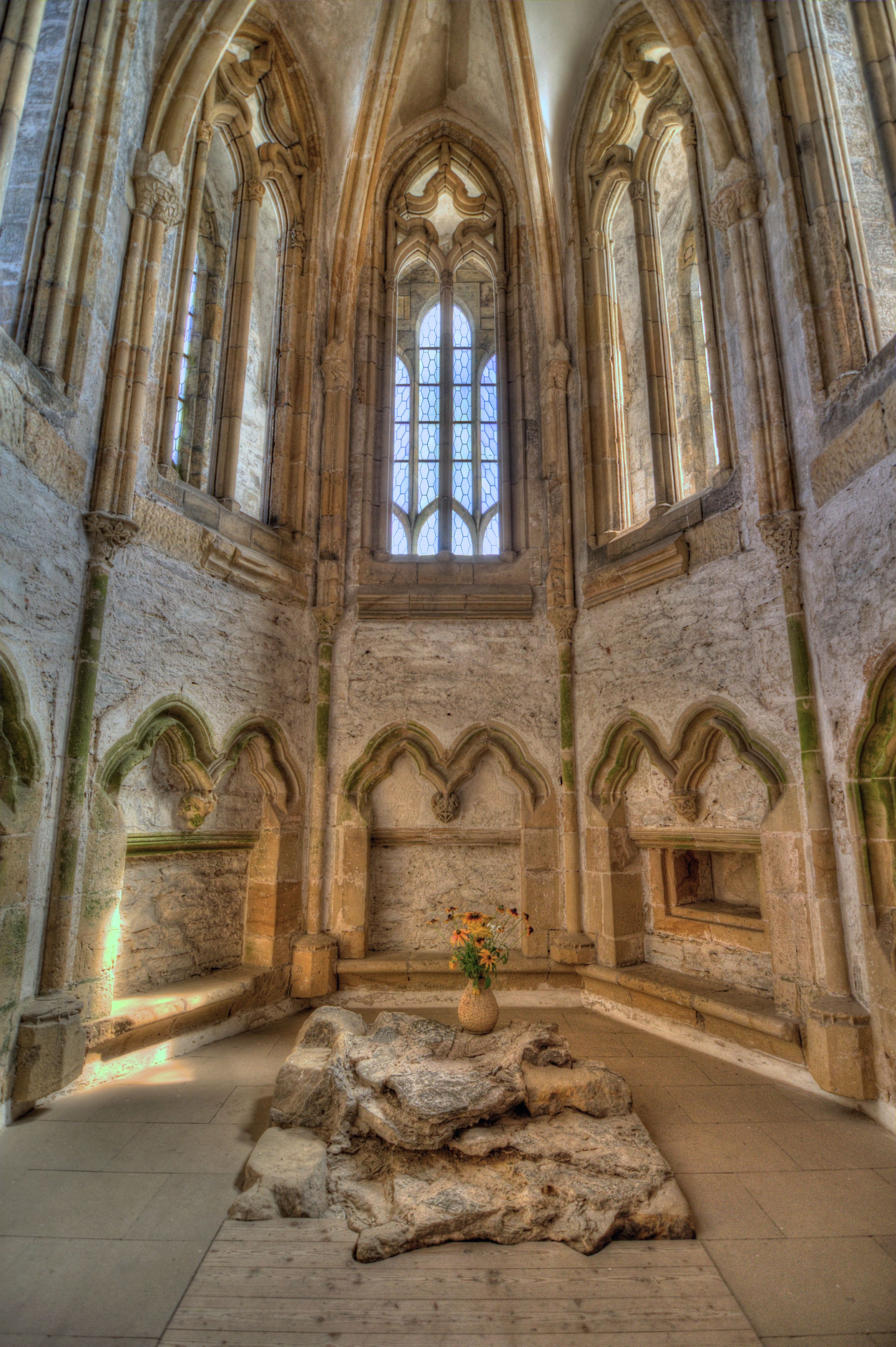
Chapel at Bezděz Castle, before 1283

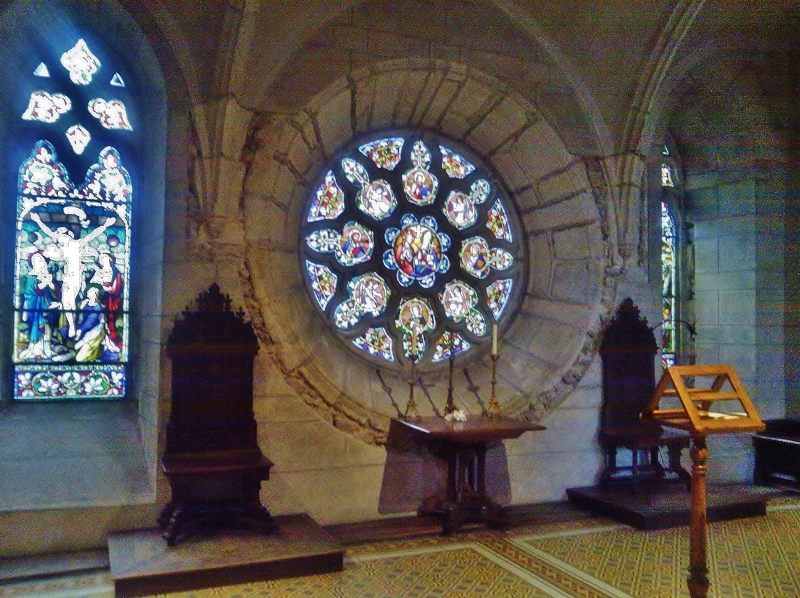
Chapter Hall of Vyšší Brod Abbey, 1285

== High Gothic ==
=== Late Přemyslid Gothic ===
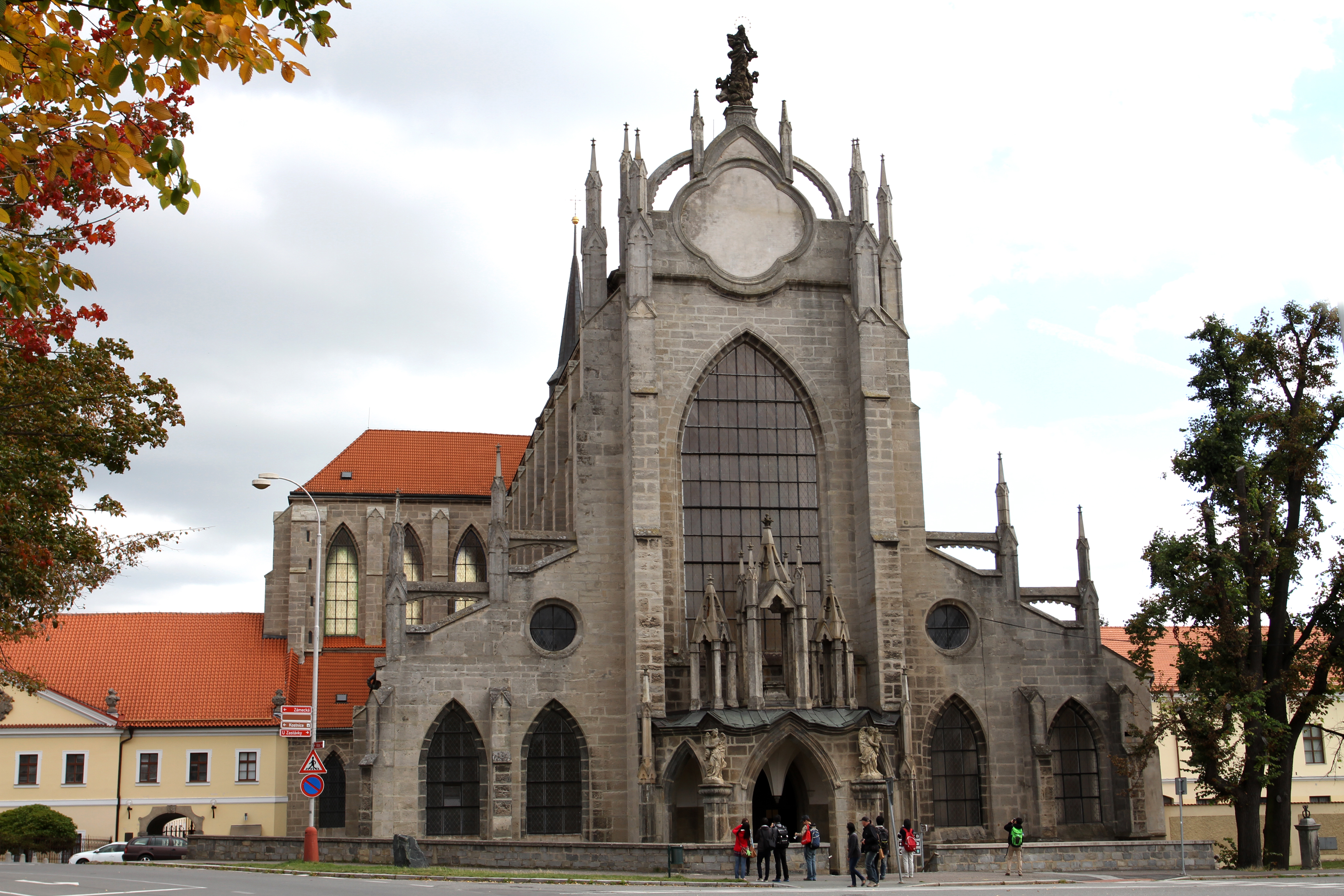
Sedlec Cathedral in Kutná Hora

The High Gothic period in the Czech lands started during the reign of the King Wenceslaus II in the 1290s. In that time the Gothic style in the Czech lands changed. The new buildings started to emphasize the verticality and light very strongly.

In the Cistercian Sedlec Abbey near Kutná Hora, the first church in the style of French Gothic cathedrals in the Czech lands was built around 1300. It is called the Church of the Assumption of Our Lady and Saint John the Baptist and although it was rebuilt in the 18th century in the Baroque Gothic style its presbytery, main nave and transept didn't lose its original appearance. It is considered to be one of the first High Gothic buildings in the Czech Republic and it was also inscribed on the UNESCO World Heritage List.

A very similar church was built in another Cistercian monastery in Zbraslav. In its time it was the biggest church in Bohemia – it was 104 meters long. The Zbraslav Cathedral was destroyed during the Hussite Wars.

=== Luxembourg Gothic ===
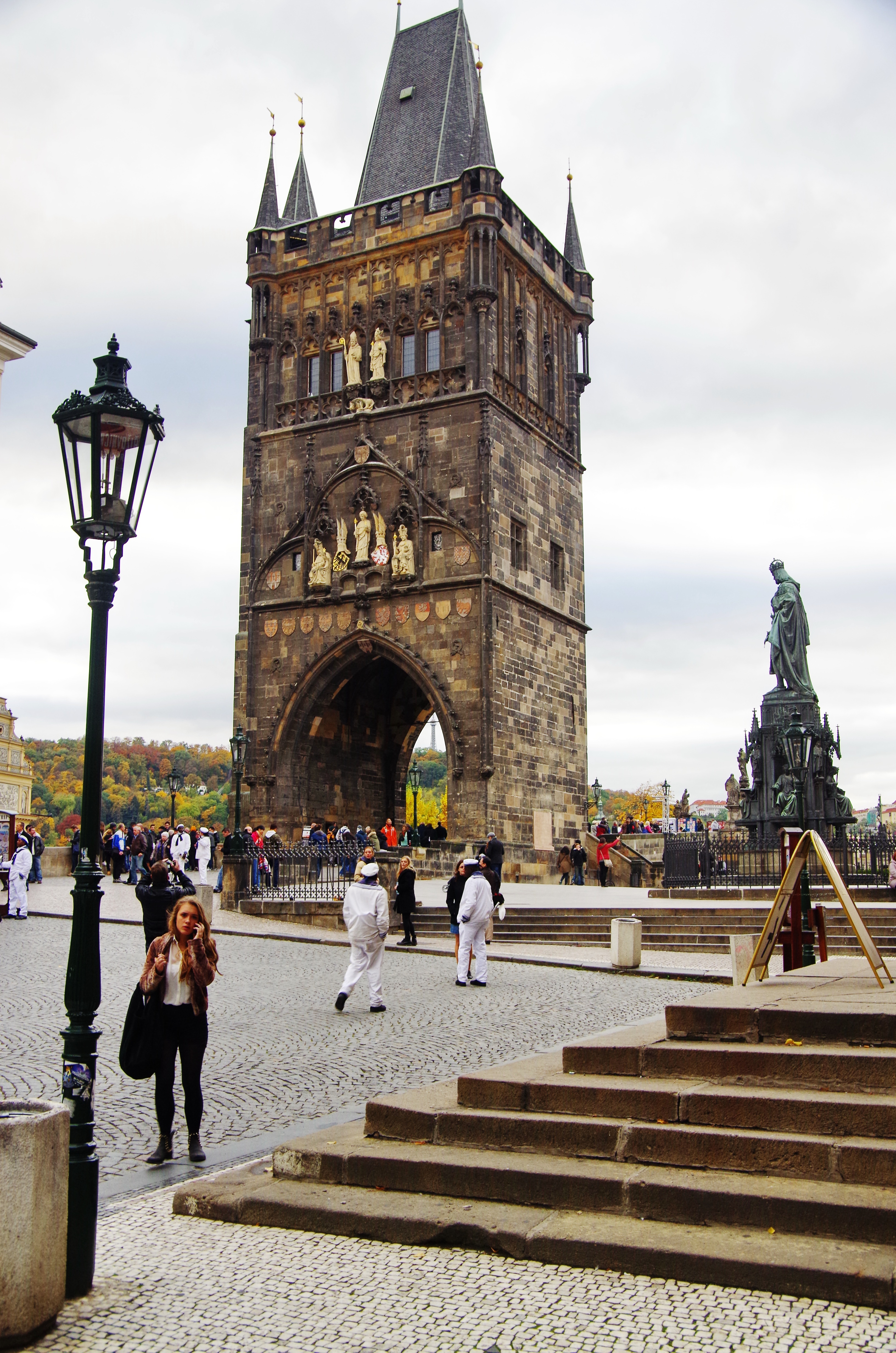
Bridge Tower of Charles Bridge in Prague

The first king of the new Luxembourg dynasty John of Luxembourg was not a great founder of new buildings. He probably rebuilt the Stone Bell House on the Old Town Square in Prague after 1310. In this time the house was decorated with great statues and paintings and was probably used as a royal residence instead of the Prague Castle which was uninhabitable after the fire in 1303.

The Bishop of Prague Jan IV. z Dražic supported the new architecture instead of the king who was often absent in the country. He founded a new workshop in his town Roudnice nad Labem to which he invited south-French builders. He started to build a new bridge in Roudnice over the river Elbe (Czech: Labe). He also invited a bridge architect William of Avignon for one year who taught the local stonemasons so that they could finish the bridge construction on their own. The Bishop also founded a new monastery with a church in Roudnice and new castles in Litovice and Dražice. He also founded a new monumental St Giles's Church (Czech: Kostel sv. Jiljí) in the Old Town of Prague and rebuilt the Bishop's residence in the Lesser Town of Prague (was destroyed during the Hussite Wars).

==== The reign of Charles IV and Wenceslaus IV ====
The heyday of the High Gothic art in the Czech lands came with John's son Charles IV. This young Bohemian Prince came to Bohemia in 1333 from France where he had been raised at the French royal court. Then he became as the first king of Bohemia the Holy Roman Emperor and so Prague became the imperial residence. The reign of Emperor Charles IV and his son King Wenceslaus IV is one of the very few periods of the Czech art when it was at the comparable level with the European development and even became the leading force in the development of European art.

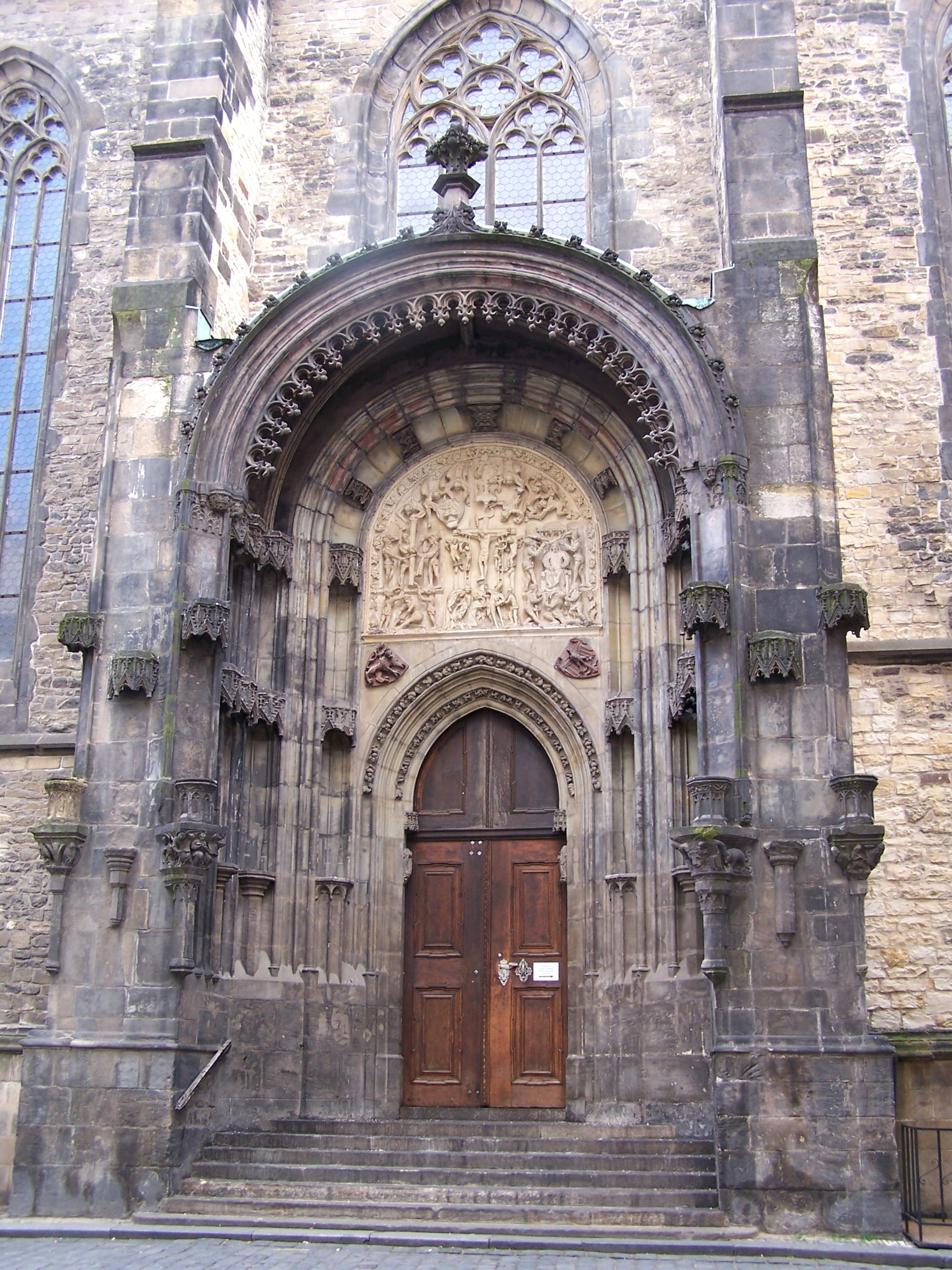
Northern portal of the Church of Our Lady before Týn in the Old Town of Prague built by Parler's workshop

Charles IV was a very important supporter of art. He founded many new buildings, for example the most important High Gothic building in the Czech Republic – the St. Vitus Cathedral at the Prague Castle – which was founded by him, his father King John and the Prague Archbishop Arnošt of Pardubice in 1344. The first architect was a Frenchman Matthias of Arras who designed the church in the French Gothic style. After his death Petr Parler (who came from Germany) became the architect of the cathedral and changed the older plans. Peter Parler built a net vault in the main nave, one of the first net vaults in the continental Europe. This net vault then inspired the vaults in many central-European churches (e. g. in Milevsko, Český Krumlov or Nysa in Poland). One of the most precious spaces of the cathedral is St. Wenceslas Chapel which resembles the Chapel of the Holy Cross at the Karlštejn Castle in central Bohemia. The building of the cathedral was interrupted by Hussite Wars and was completed first in the early 20th century. Charles IV also ordered to rebuild the Old Royal Palace at the Prague Castle, his son Wenceslaus IV then continued in the rebuilding after Charles's death.

Another important building of Prague High Gothic architecture is Charles Bridge with its Old Town Bridge Tower built by Petr Parler and which is one of the largest and most beautiful Gothic gates in Europe.

Petr Parler also designed the new presbytery of St. Bartholomew Church in Kolín (Czech: Kostel sv. Bartoloměje). The work of Petr Parler later became a great inspiration for central-European Late Gothic architects.

The most important Czech High Gothic castle is the Karlštejn Castle built in 1348–1357 (and decorated until 1367) where the unique Chapel of the Holy Cross can be seen which should have looked like the Heavenly Jerusalem and in which the most precious holy relics and jewels of the Kingdom of Bohemia and Holy Roman Empire were kept (e. g. the Imperial Crown of the Holy Roman Empire). Its walls are decorated with precious stones and with 130 pictures of saints painted by Theodoric of Prague, its golden ceiling resembles the sky with stars, sun and moon.

During the reign of Wenceslaus IV the Gothic style changed a bit into the so-called International Gothic which was characterized by replacing monumentality with elegance (therefore it is also known as the "Beautiful style"). Typical for the International Gothic architecture especially in Central Europe were the hall churches. The hall churches usually also had thin tall columns supporting the vault. Typical examples of International Gothic architecture in the Kingdom of Bohemia are the south-Bohemian churches of St Giles in Třeboň (Czech: Kostel sv. Jiljí) and of St Vitus in Soběslav (Czech: Kostel sv. Víta). The king himself ordered to rebuild the Italian Court in Kutná Hora and to build the Točník Castle. Another important church was St Vitus Church in Český Krumlov built after 1407 as a hall church with a net vault in the main nave.

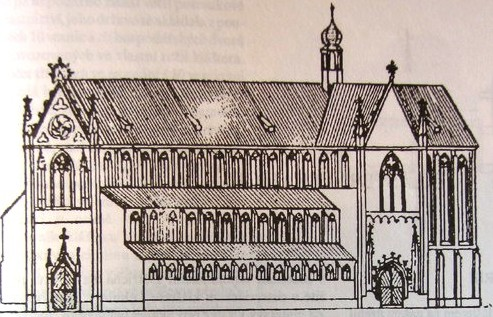
Baroque drawing of the destroyed Cathedral of Zbraslav Monastery, c. 1300

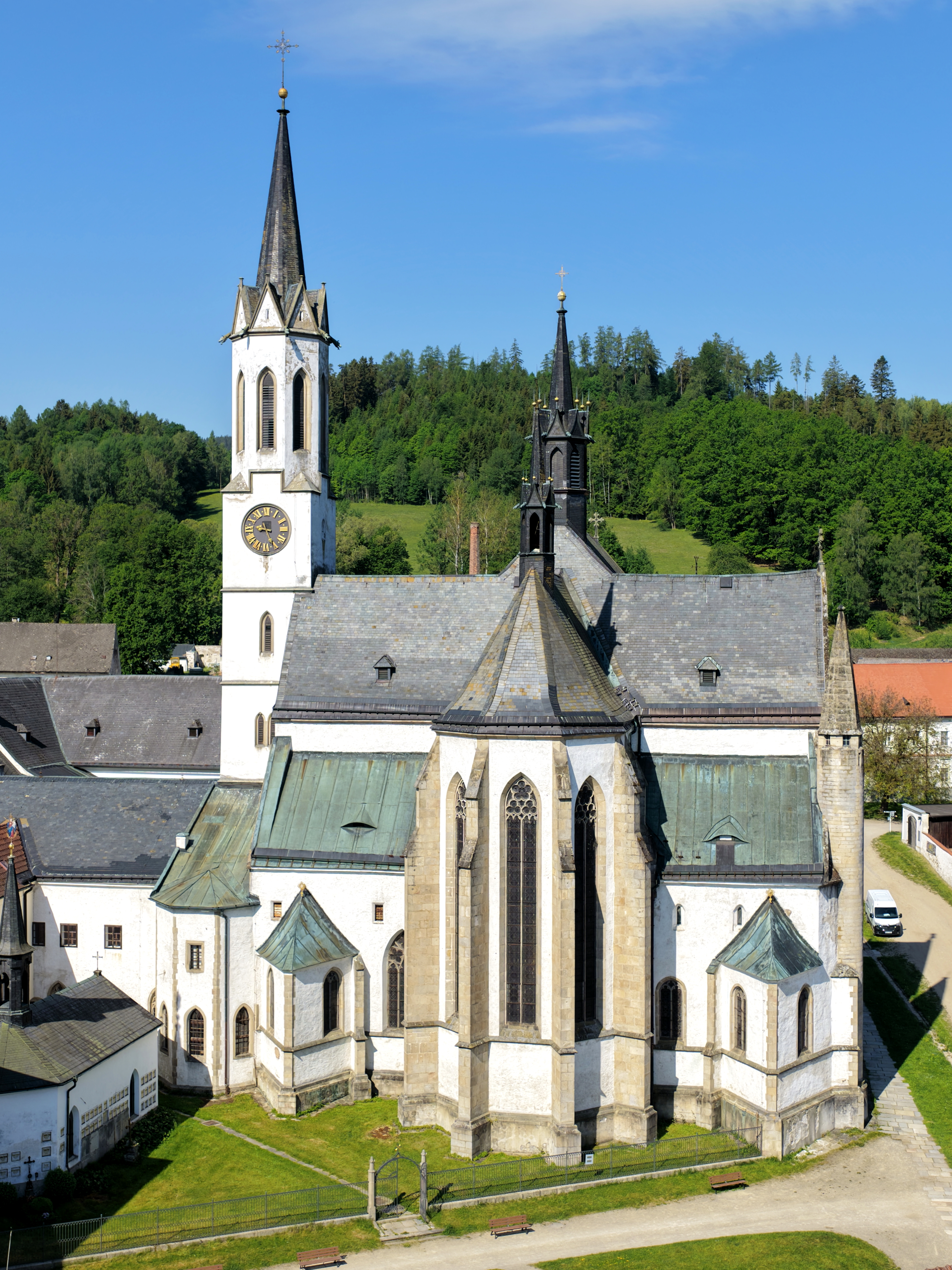
Church of Vyšší Brod Monastery, c. 1300

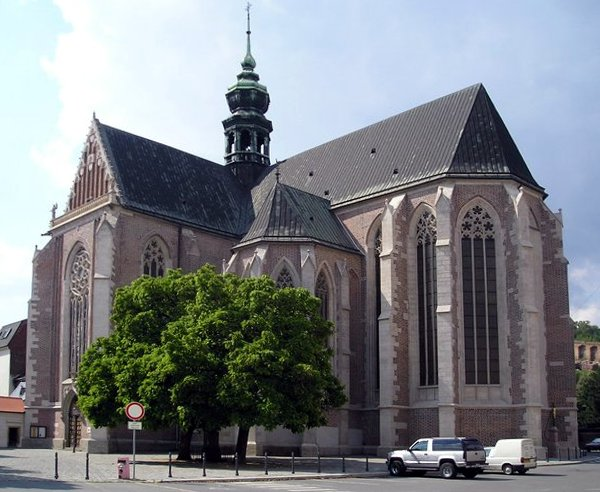
Church of the Assumption of the Virgin Mary in Brno, after 1323

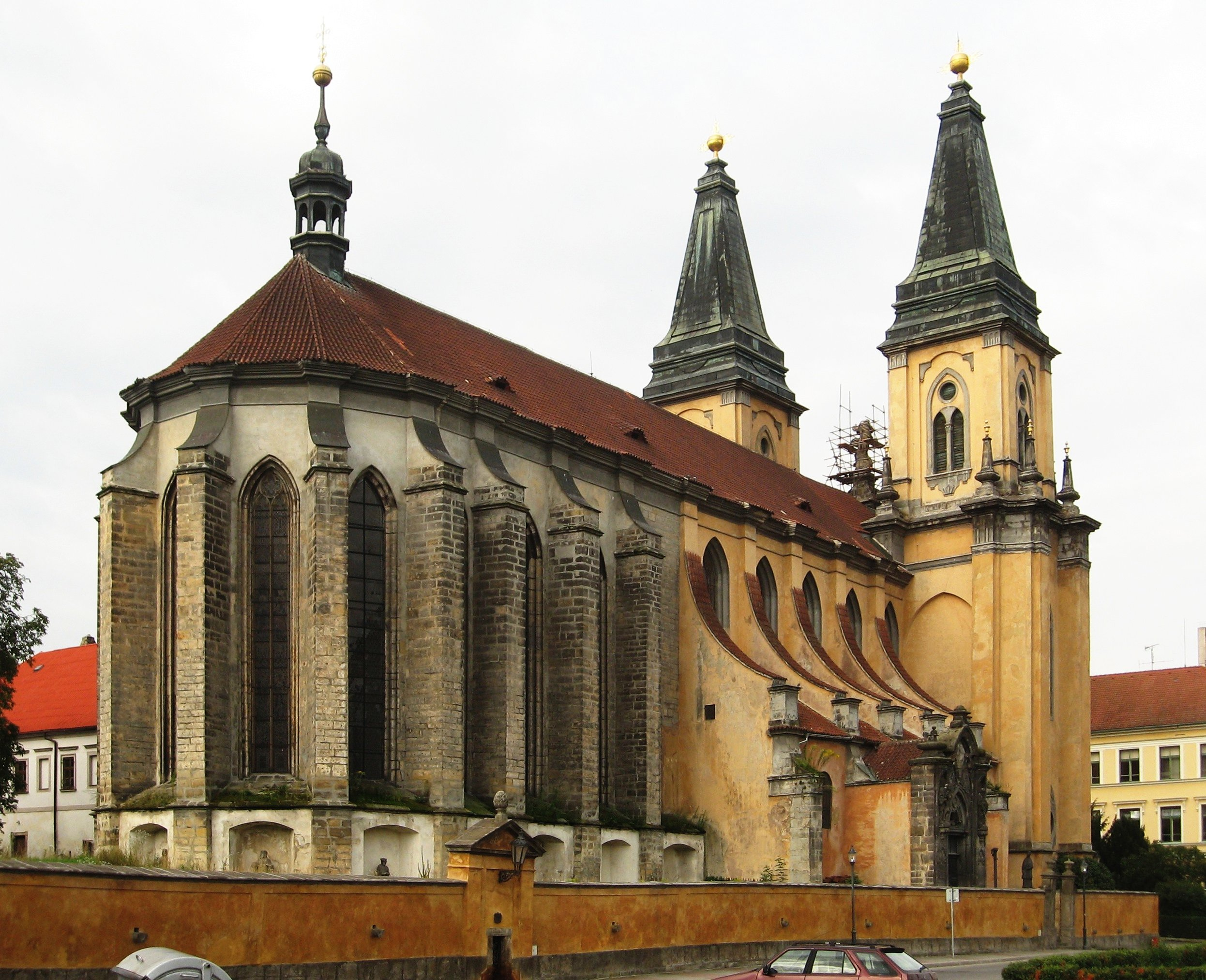
Church in Roudnice nad Labem founded in 1333 by Prague Bishop Jan IV. z Dražic

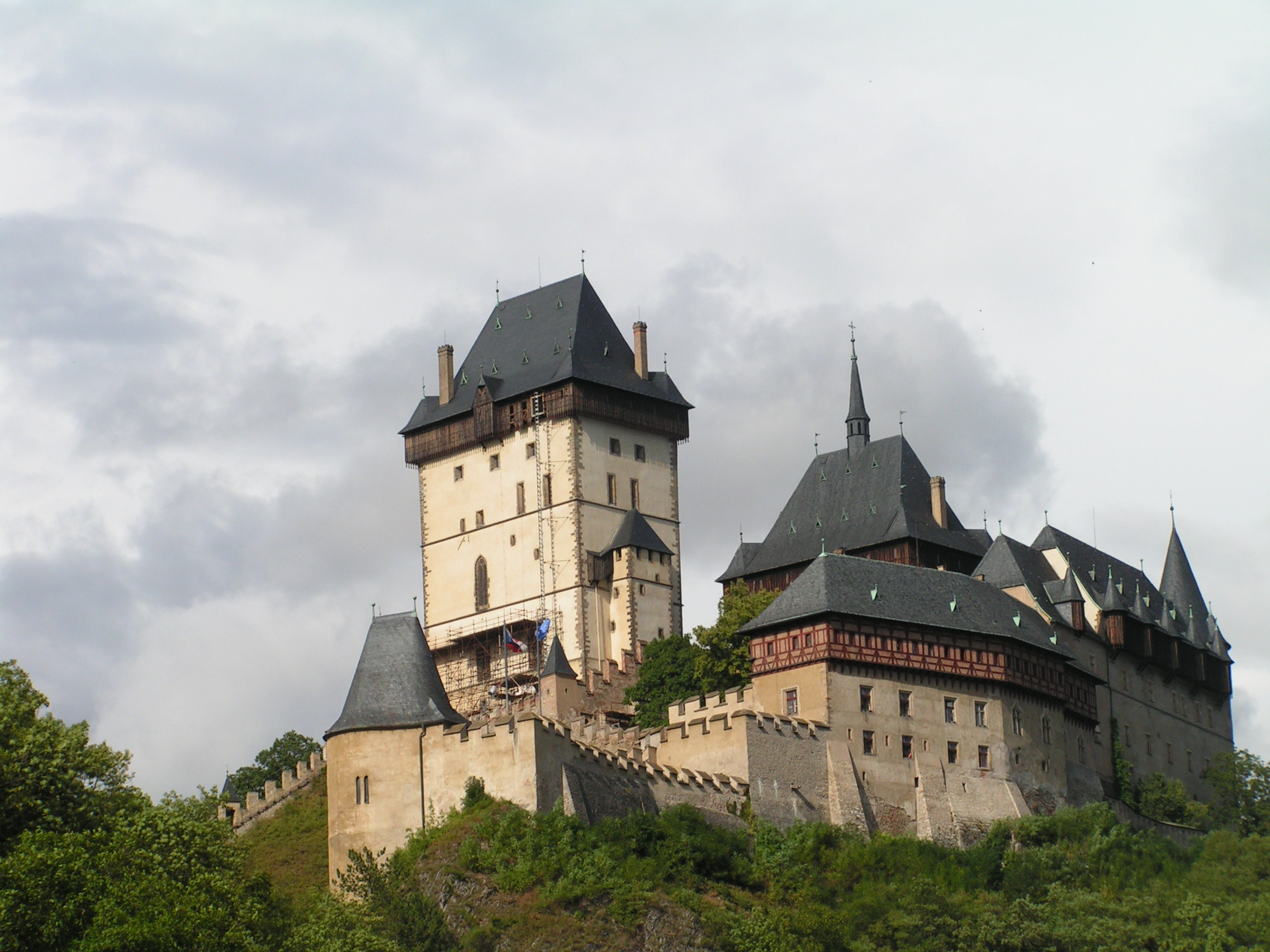
Karlstejn Castle, Bohemia, 1348–1357

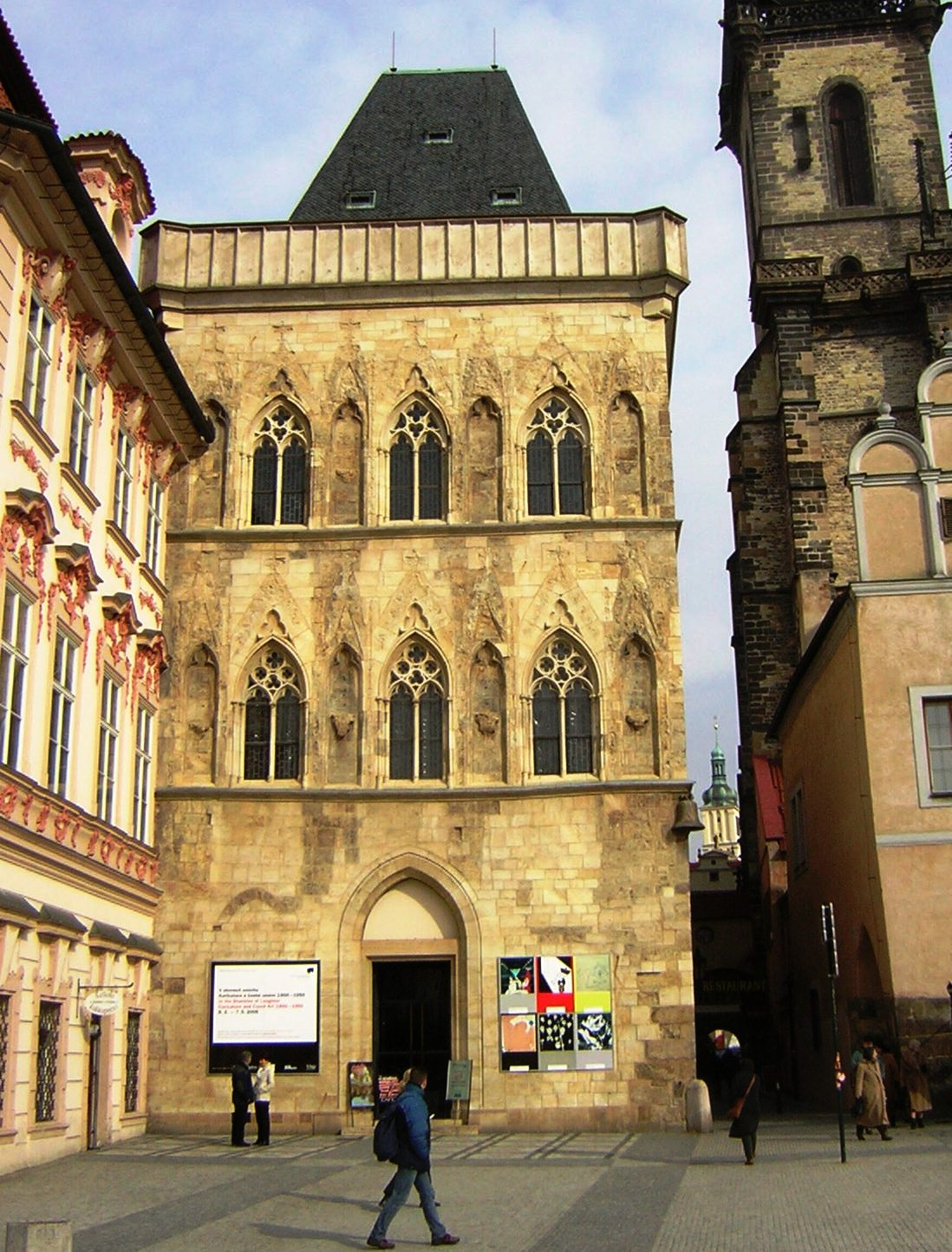
Stone Bell House in the Old Town of Prague, after 1310

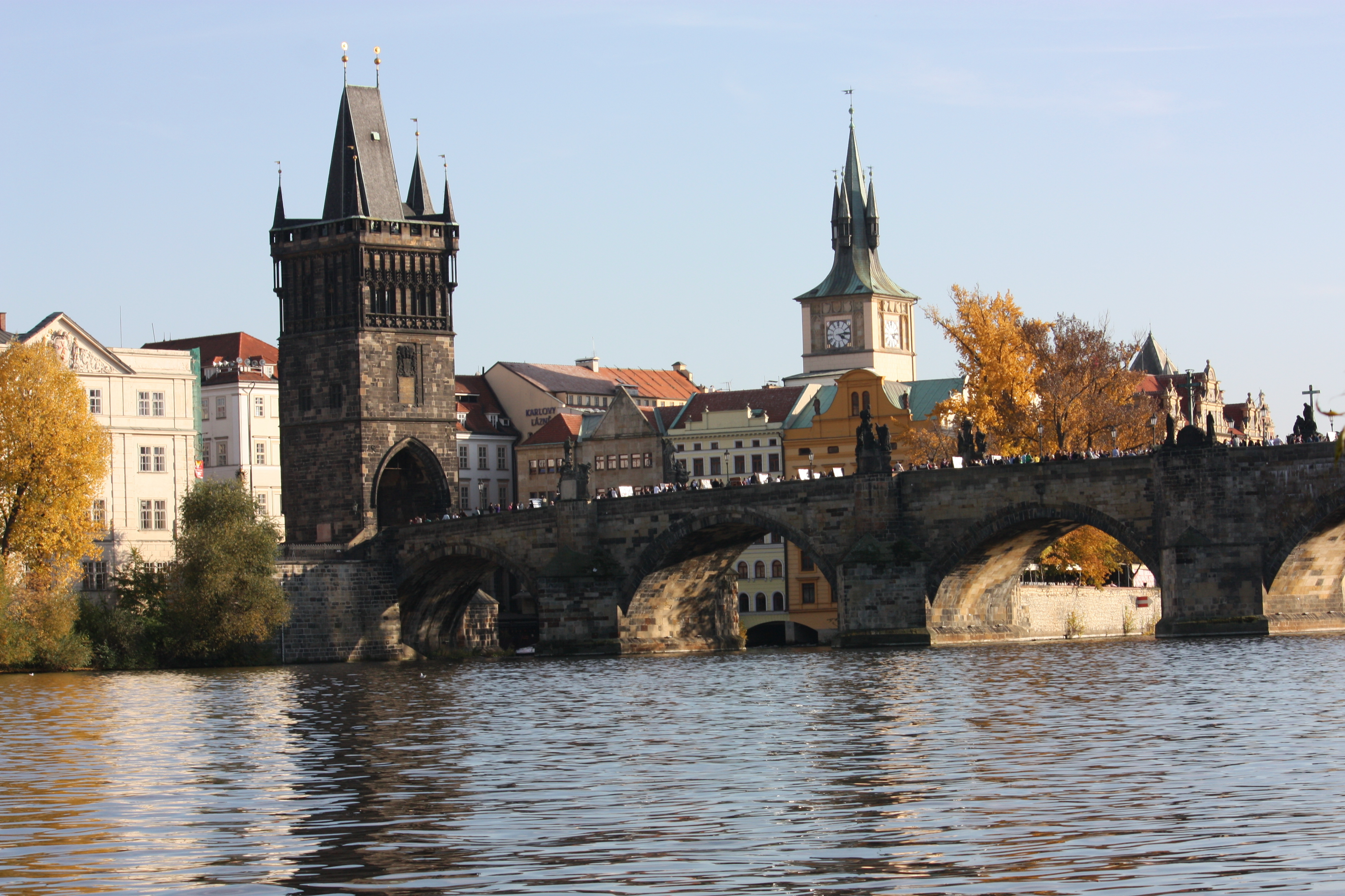
Charles Bridge in Prague after 1357

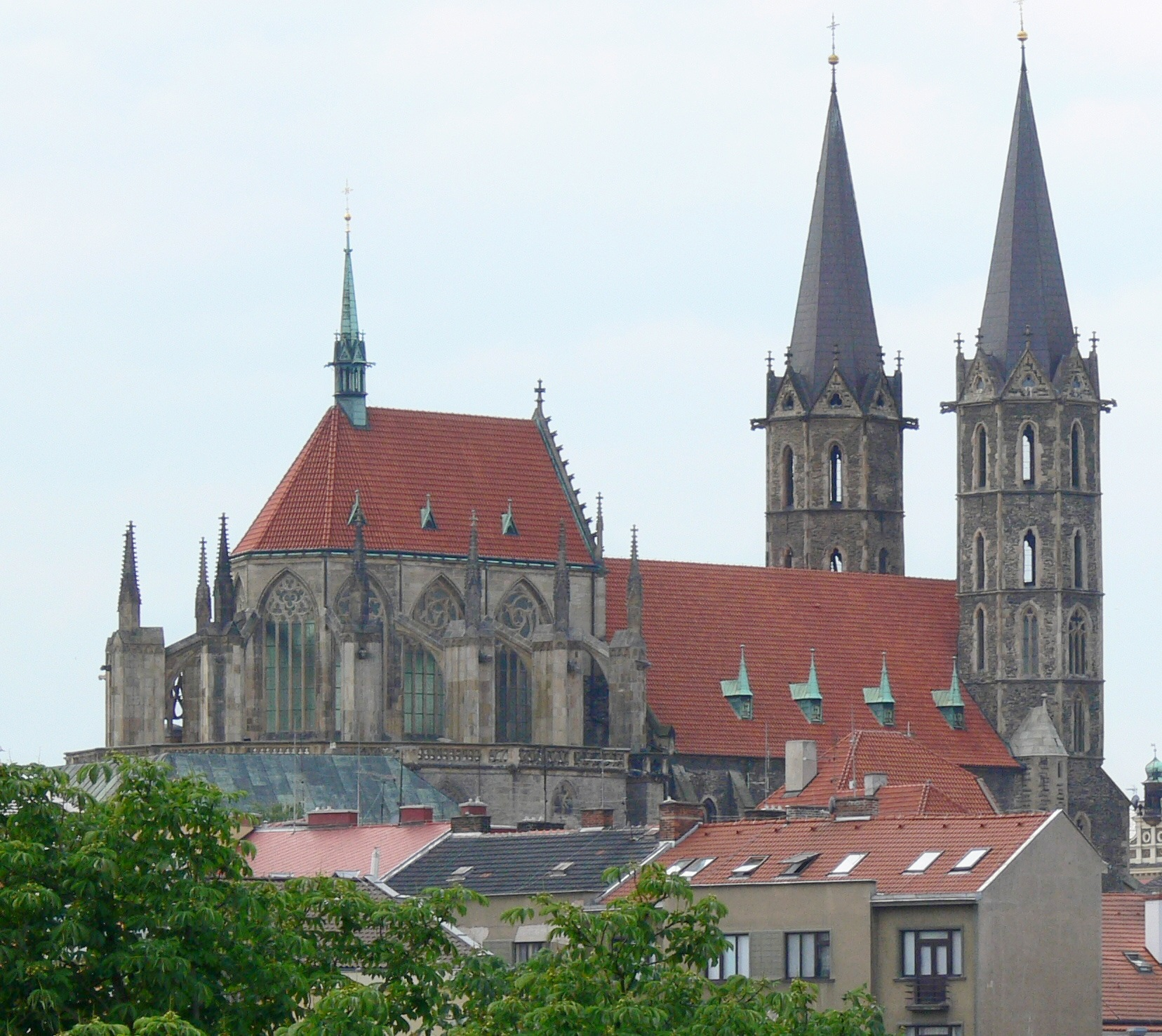
Church of St. Bartholomew in Kolín with its high presbytery, 1360–1378

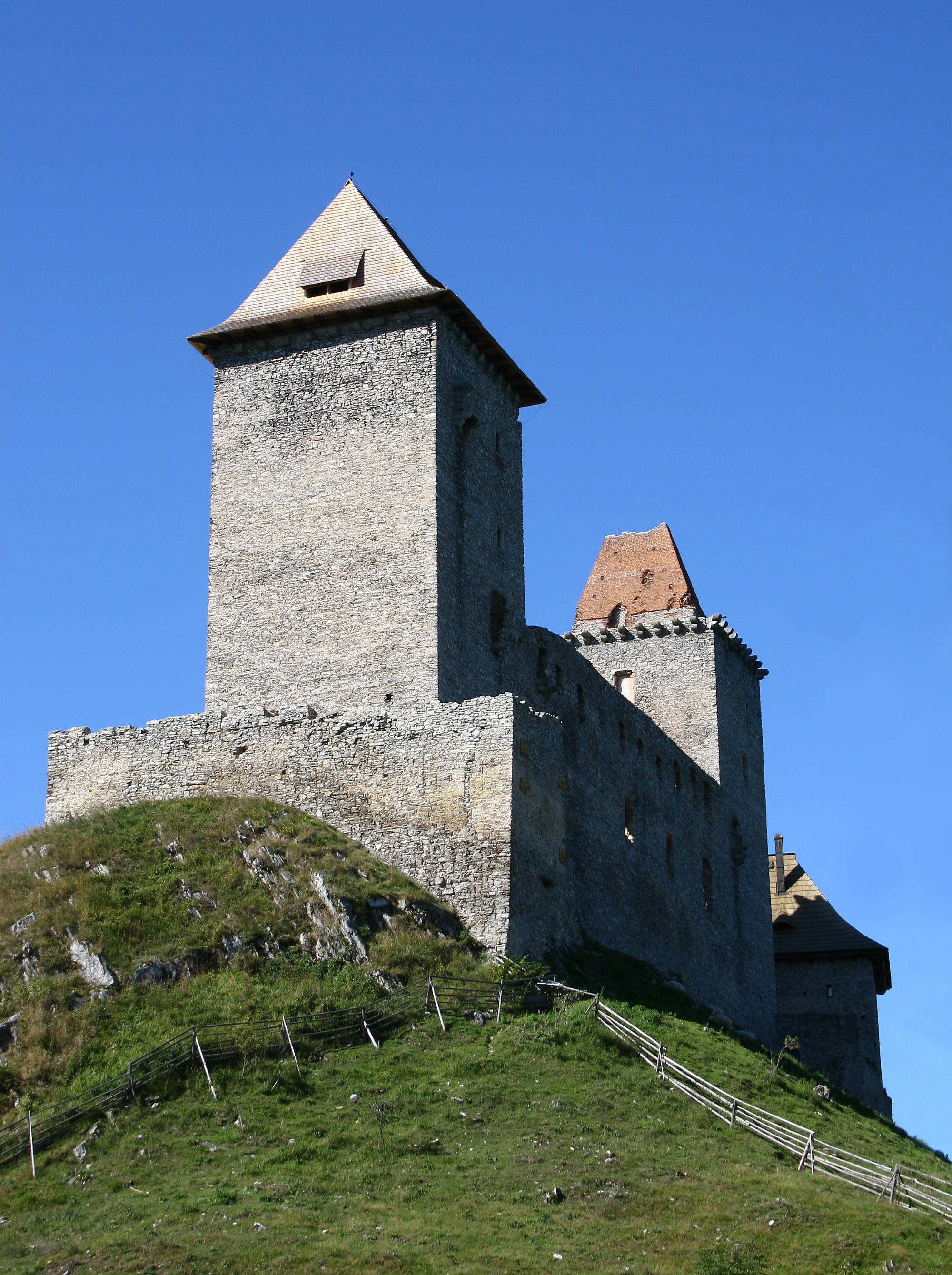
Kašperk Castle, southwestern Bohemia, after 1356

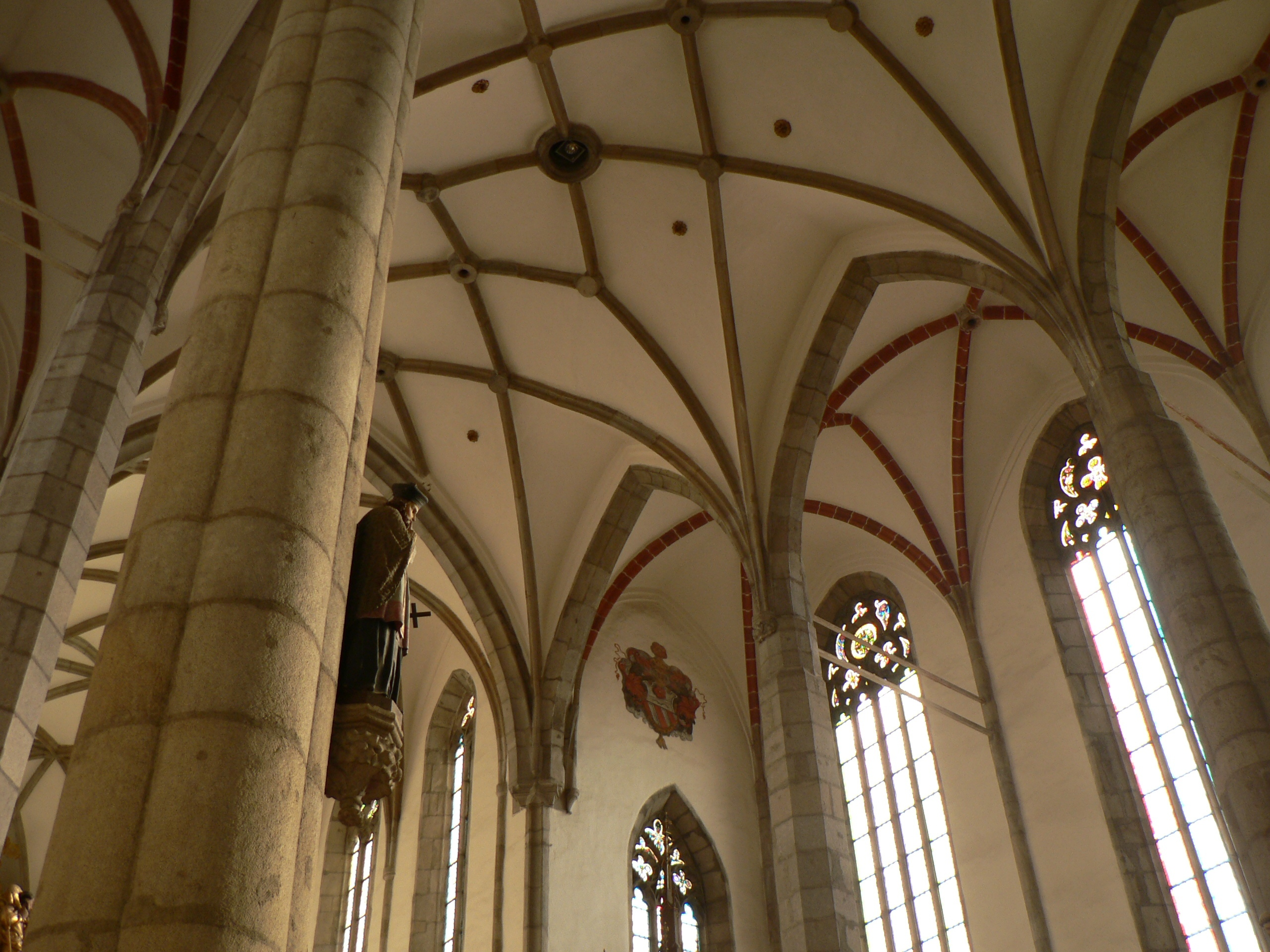
Interior of St Vitus Church in Český Krumlov, after 1407

== Late Gothic ==
The heyday of the High Gothic architecture in the Crown of Bohemia was stopped by the outbreak of the Hussite Wars in 1419. Many churches, monasteries and castles were burnt down and many new buildings were left unfinished by the builders, such as St Vitus Cathedral at Prague Castle. The amazing fortification system of the Hussite town Tábor is probably the only precious architectural work of that time. During the wars and many years after them there was not enough money to build any precious buildings. The only important monuments of that time in Prague are the Church of Our Lady before Týn in the Old Town of Prague (used as the main Hussite church in Bohemia) whose building continued after the wars and the higher tower of the gate of the Charles Bridge in the Lesser Town of Prague which was built at the expense of King George after 1464.

=== Jagiellonian Gothic ===
The bad situation of the Czech art caused by wars and political instability was improved after 1471 when a Catholic Polish prince Vladislaus Jagiellon (grandson of Bohemian Princess Elisabeth of Luxembourg granddaughter of Charles IV) became the new king of Bohemia and especially after 1485 when religious freedom was enacted (for Catholics and Hussites) and so the religious wars finally ended.

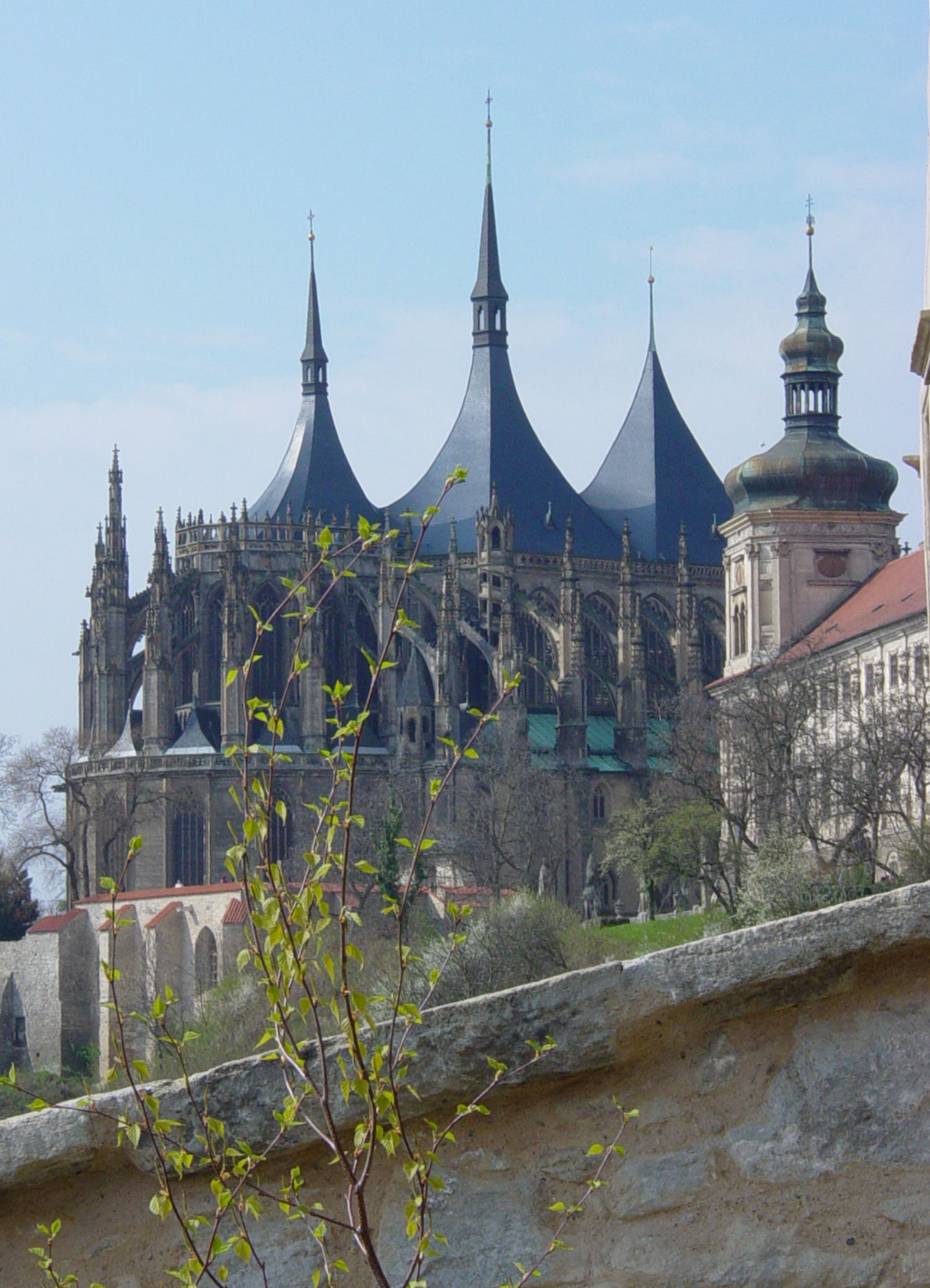
St. Barbara's Church in Kutná Hora

While the Renaissance style flourished in Italy and Western Europe and Hungary were under its influence, the Czech art returned in its style to the legacy of the old Gothic masters. Bohemia was not the only country which did not accept the Renaissance art very early and tried to develop the older Gothic style into new forms – it was also the case of Austria, Bavaria, Saxony or England (see Tudor architecture). Although they still used the Gothic style, they slowly started to mix it with some Renaissance elements.

The most important architect of the Czech Late Gothic style was Benedikt Rejt who worked for the King Vladislaus. He rebuilt Prague Castle in the Late Gothic style and also used some Early Renaissance elements. Rejt's masterpiece is the Vladislav Hall in the Old Royal Palace of Prague Castle which was completed in 1502, and was at its time the largest secular vaulted space (without inner supporting columns) at least in Central Europe.

Benedikt Rejt completed the St. Barbara's Church in Kutná Hora in the Late Gothic style using a vault very similar to the vault of the Vladislav Hall. This church has a typical Late Gothic tent roof.

Together with Hans Spiess Benedikt Rejt built the Royal Oratory in St. Vitus Cathedral at Prague Castle after 1490. The interesting vault of this oratory has naturalistically executed dry cut branches, tied with strong ropes at the top of arches, instead of usual ribs. Hans Spiess who came from Frankfurt am Main also rebuilt the royal Křivoklát Castle in central Bohemia.

Another important Late Gothic architect was Matěj Rejsek who was of Czech origin. He built the Powder Gate in Prague in 1475–84 which was inspired by the Old Town Bridge Tower.

In Brno Austrian architect Anton Pilgram was active where he designed the very interesting portal of the Old Town Hall.

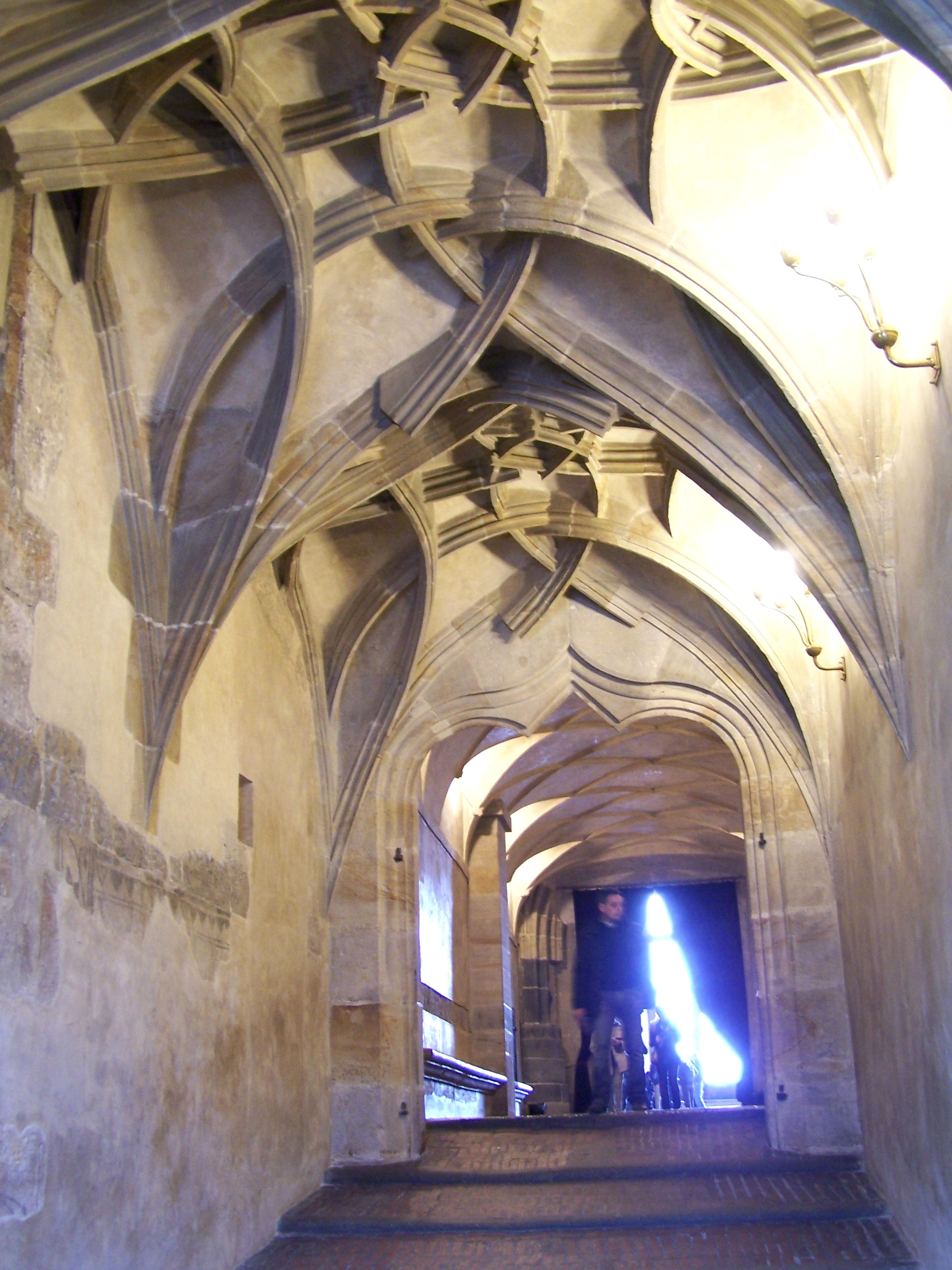
Equestrian staircase of Prague Castle, around 1500

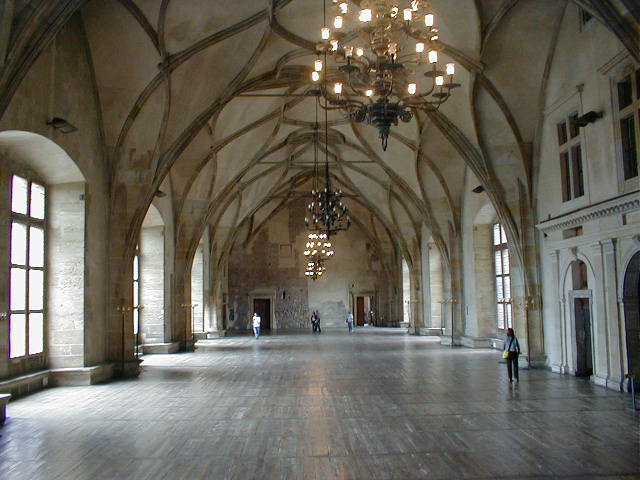
Vladislav Hall at Prague Castle by Benedikt Rejt, around 1500

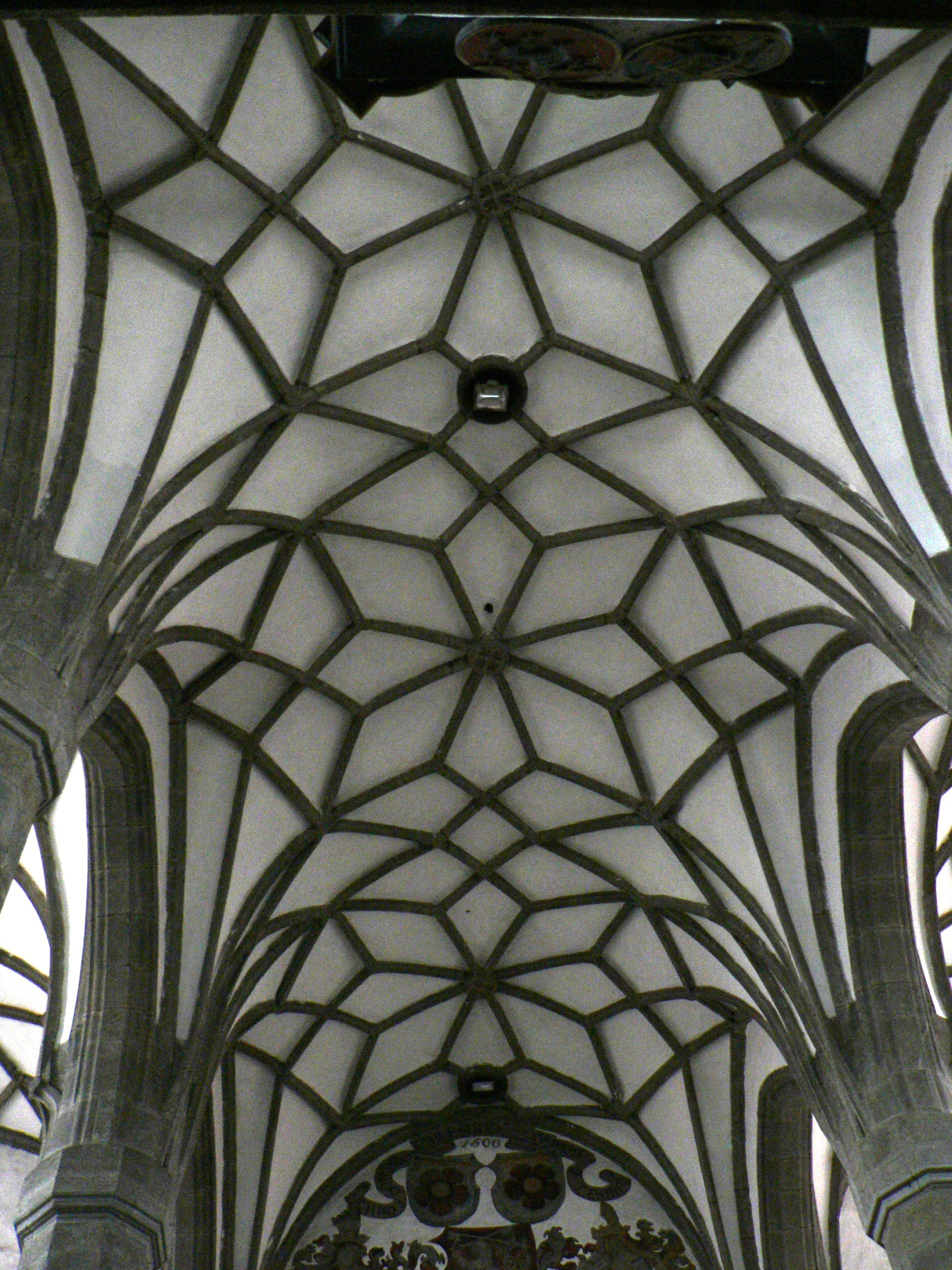
Vault of St James Church in Prachatice, 1505–1513

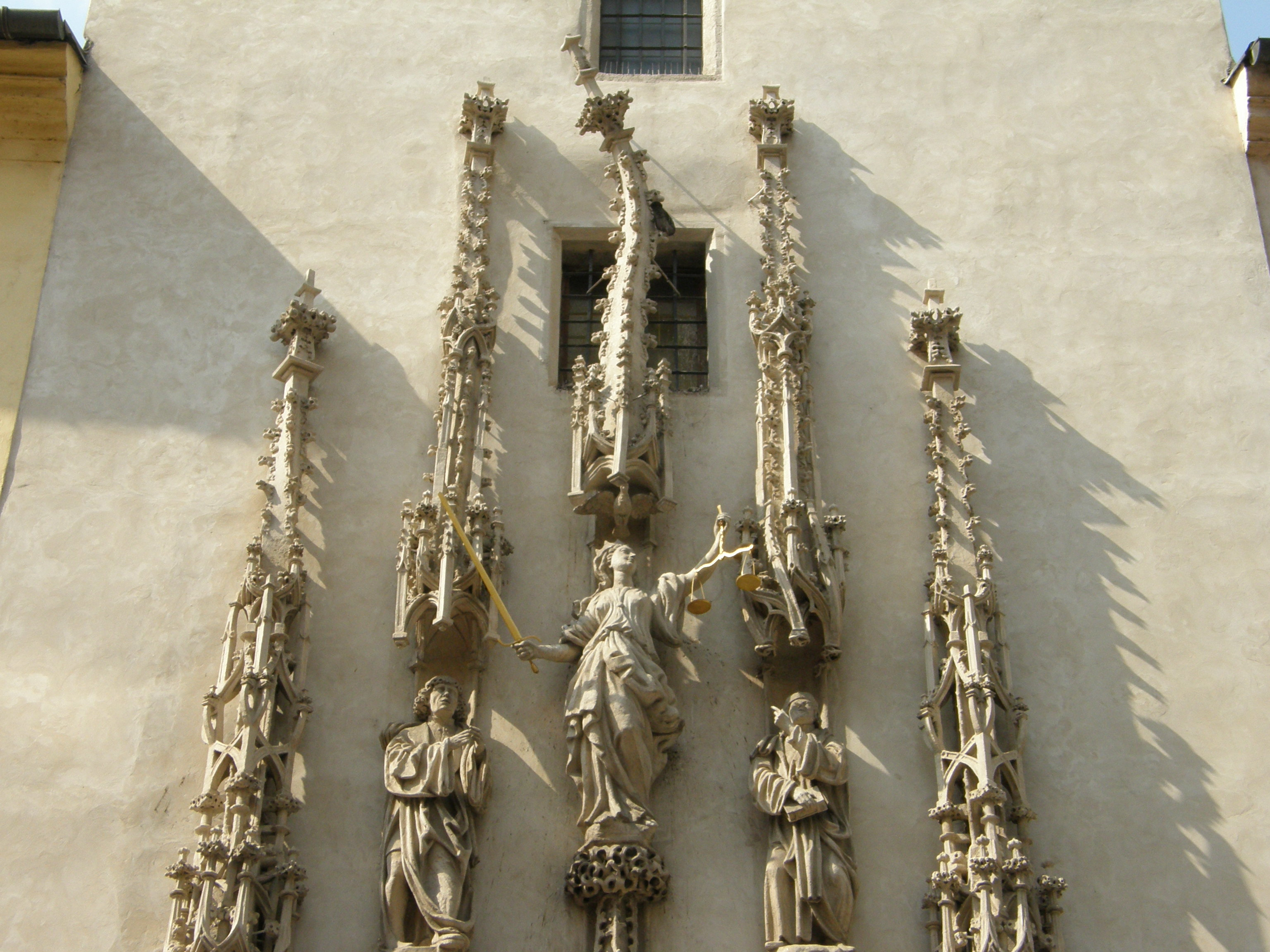
Portal of the Old Town Hall in Brno by Anton Pilgram, 1510–1511

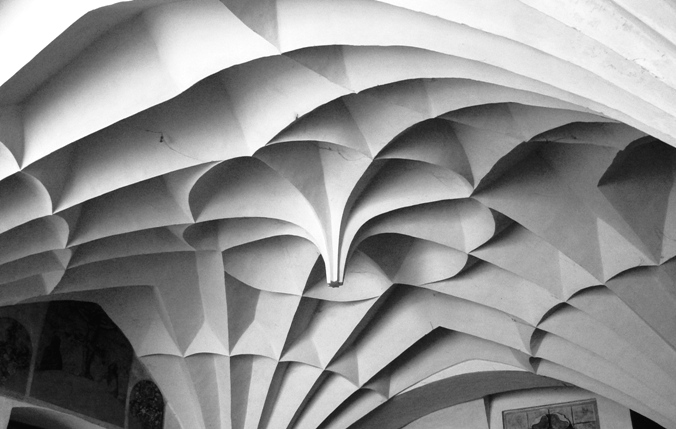
Vault in a house in Slavonice

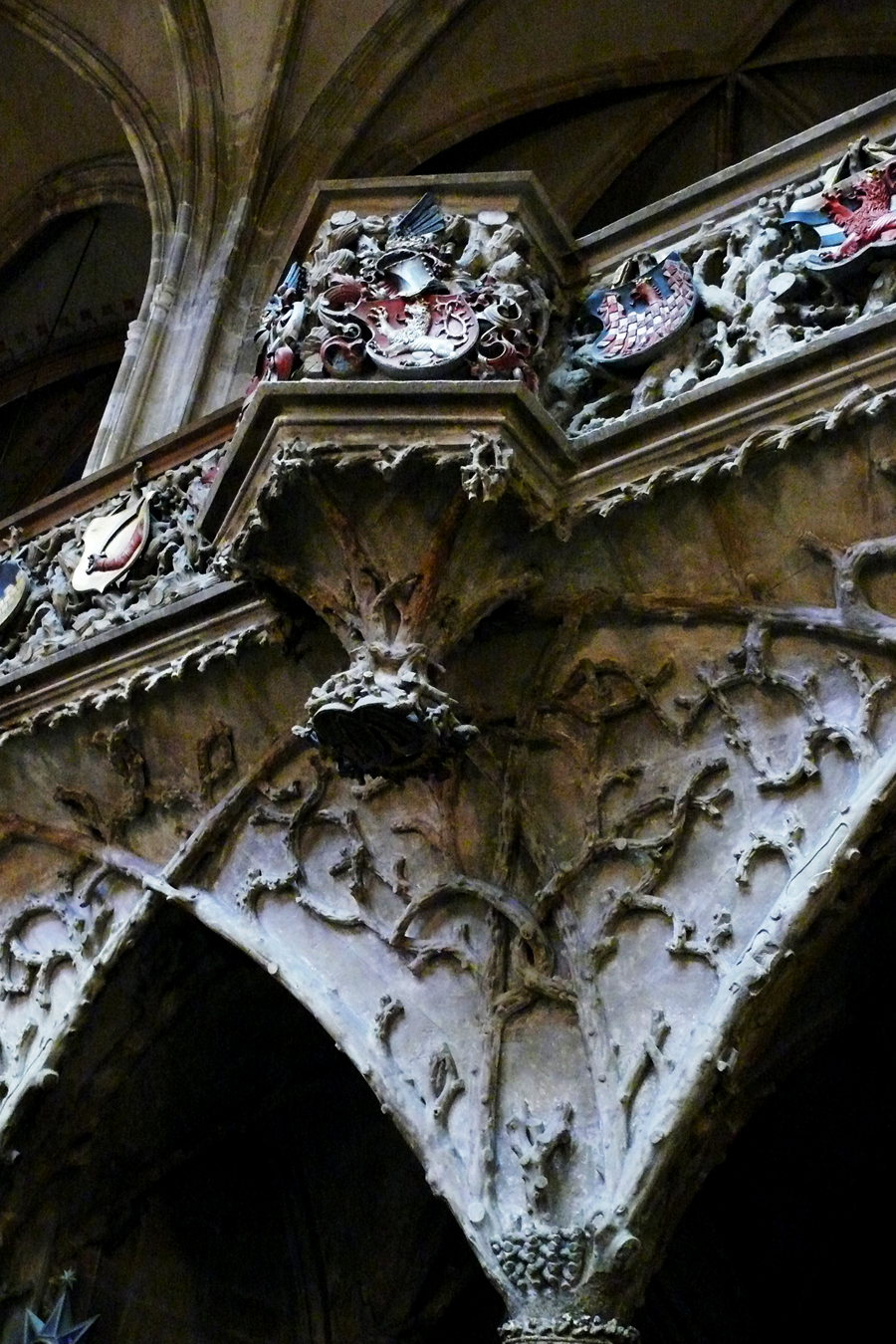
Royal Oratory in St. Vitus Cathedral in Prague, built by Benedikt Rejt and Hans Spiess, around 1500

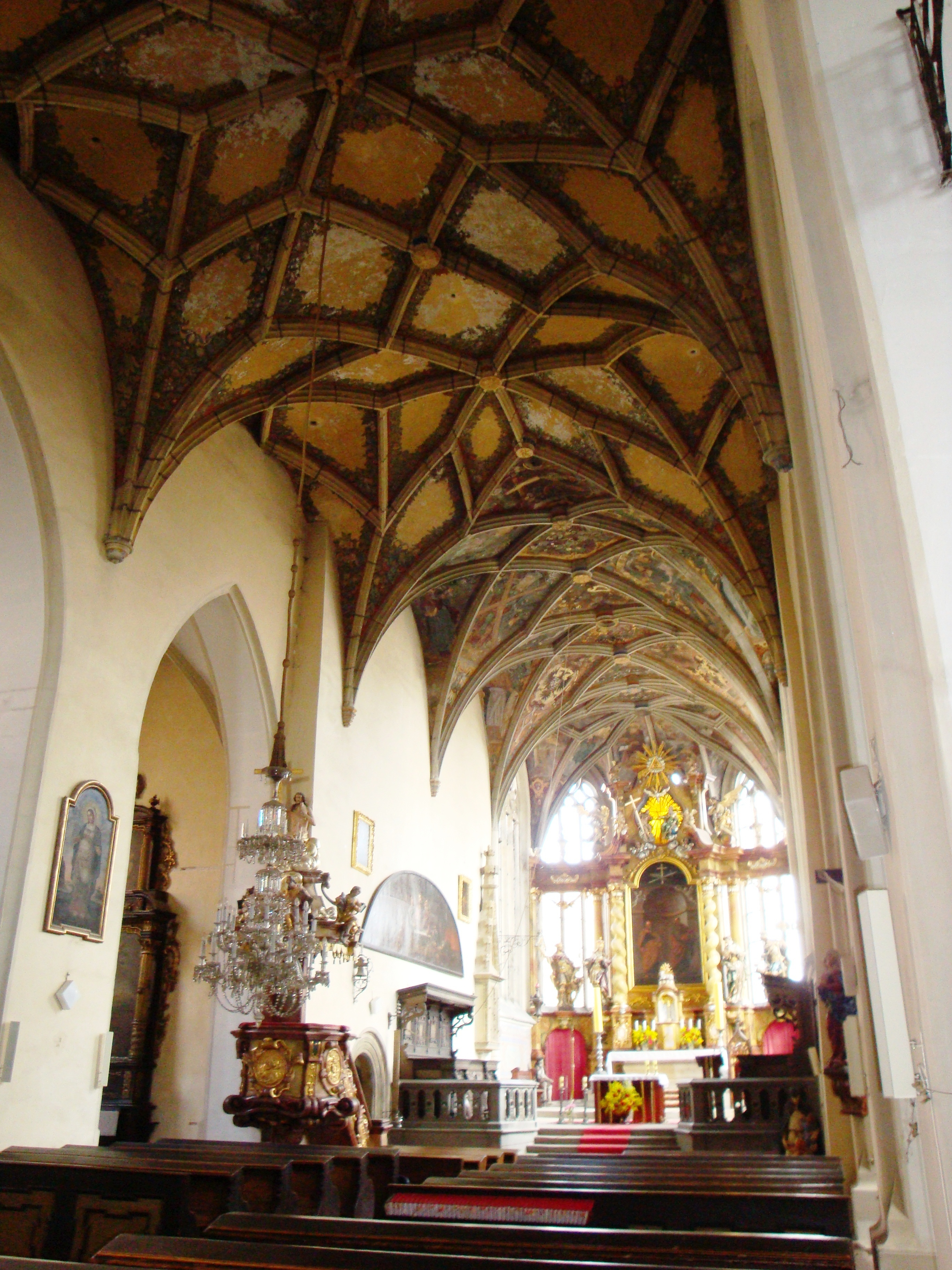
Vault of the Church of SS Peter and Paul in Mělník by Hans Spiess, 1490s

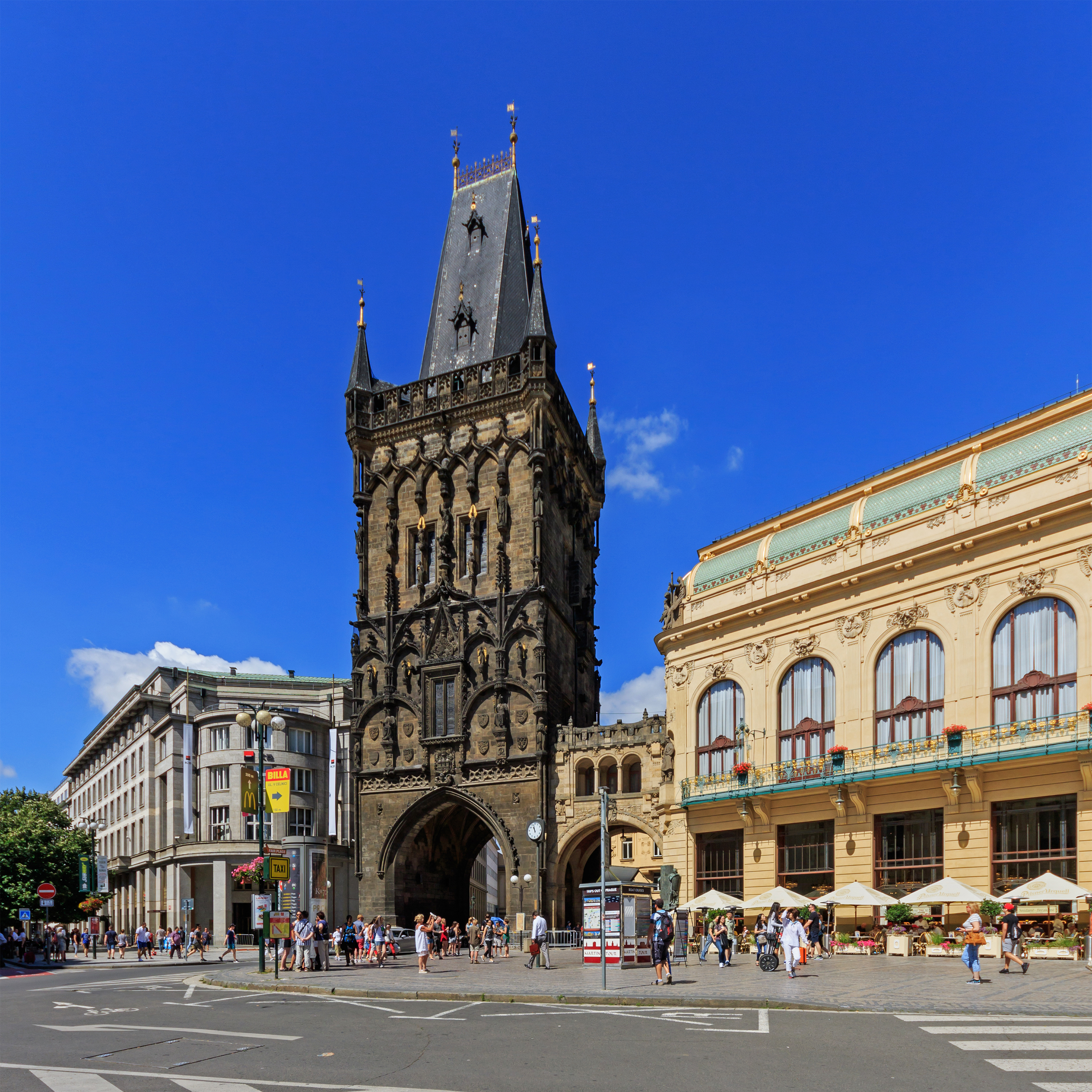
Powder Tower in Prague by Matěj Rejsek, 1475–1484

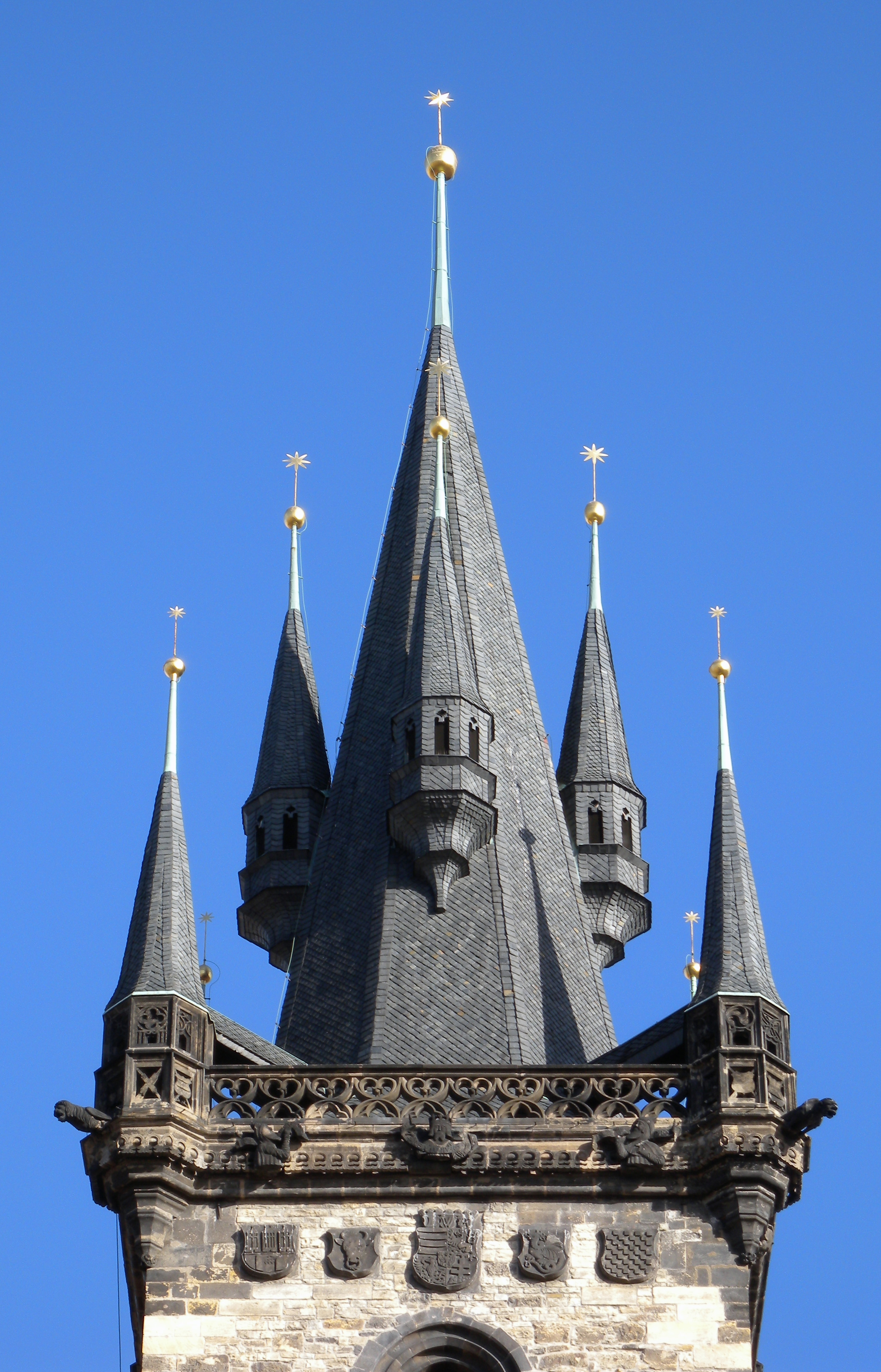
Tower of the Church of Our Lady before Týn in Prague with its original roof, before 1511

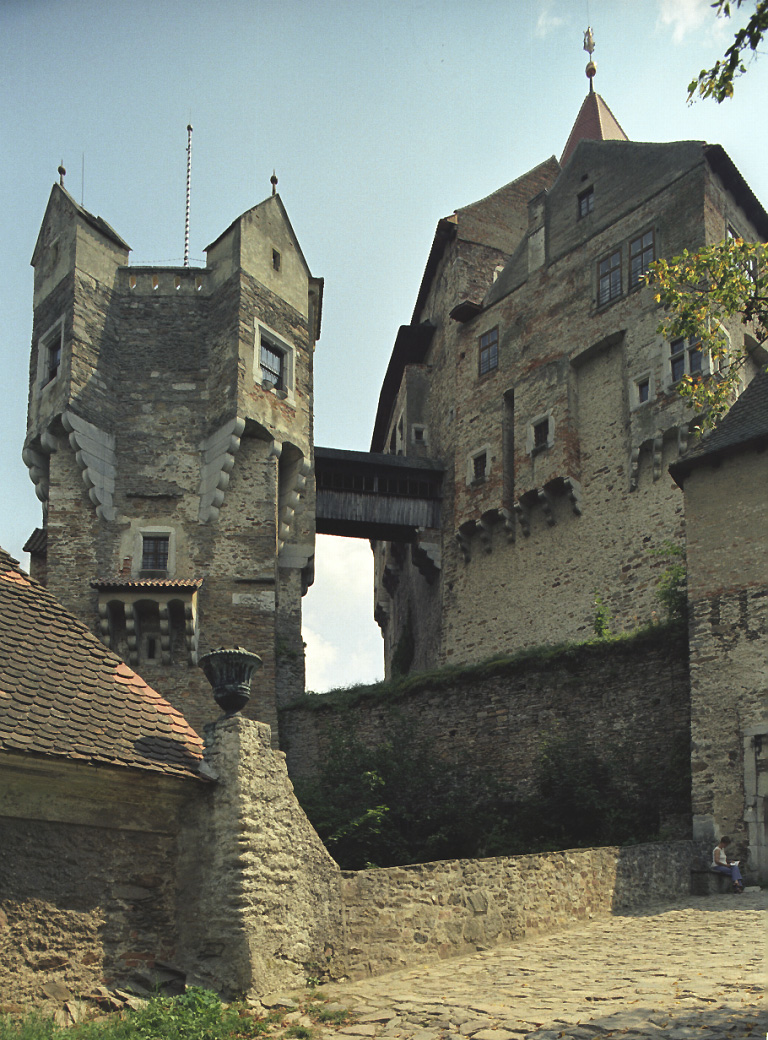
Pernštejn Castle, Moravia, turn of the 15th and 16th century

== See also ==
- Gothic architecture
- Czech Renaissance architecture
- Czech Baroque architecture
