= Potvorov =

- Municipality
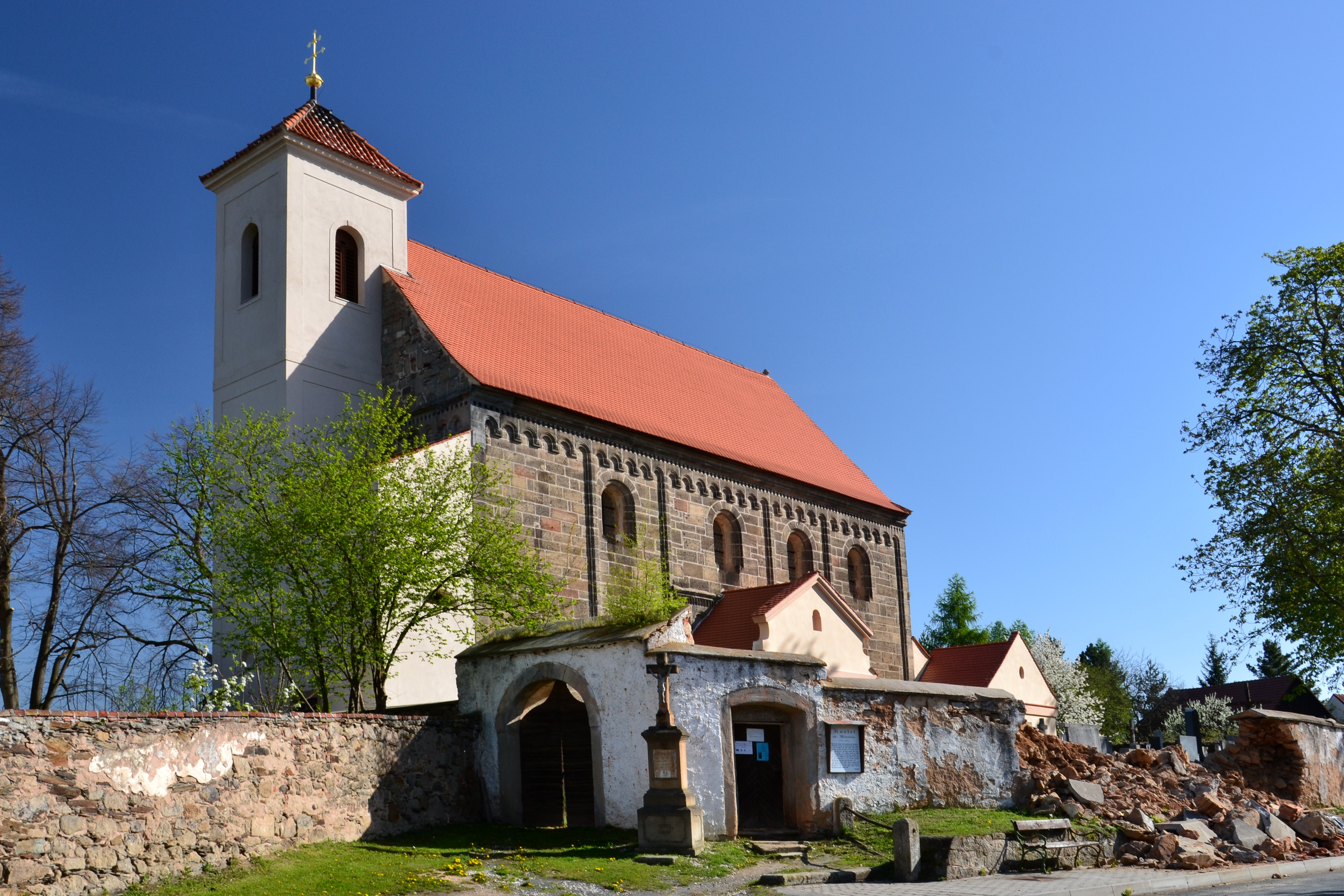
- Church of Saint Nicholas

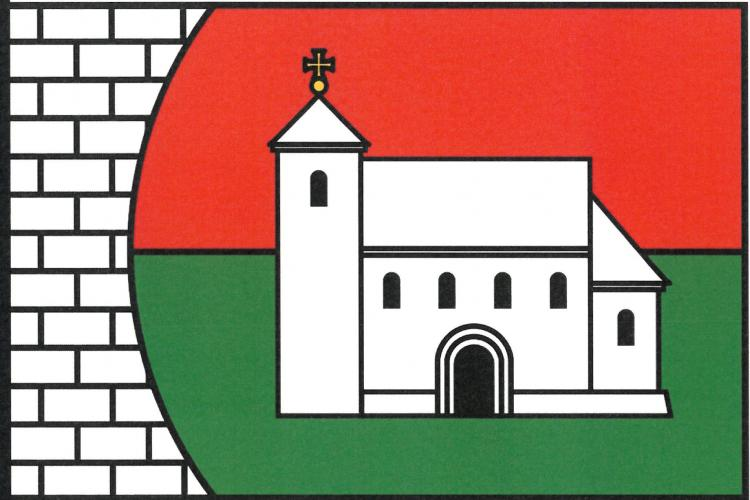
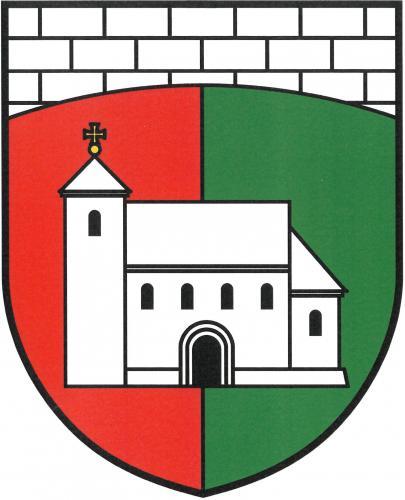
- Flag Coat of arms

- Location in the Czech Republic
- Coordinates: 50°0′8″N 13°23′58″E
- Country: Czech Republic
- Region: Plzeň
- District: Plzeň-North
- First mentioned: 1204

Area
  - Total: 6.23 km^{2} (2.41 sq mi)
- Elevation: 525 m (1,722 ft)

Population (2026-01-01)
  - Total: 133
  - Density: 21.3/km^{2} (55.3/sq mi)
- Time zone: UTC+1 (CET)
  - Summer (DST): UTC+2 (CEST)
- Postal code: 331 41
- Website: www.obec-potvorov.cz

Potvorov is a municipality and village in Plzeň-North District in the Plzeň Region of the Czech Republic. It has about 100 inhabitants.

Potvorov lies approximately 30 kilometres (19 mi) north of Plzeň and 74 km (46 mi) west of Prague.

== Demographics ==
Historical population
Year	Pop.	±%
1869	516	—
1880	418	−19.0%
1890	436	+4.3%
1900	458	+5.0%
1910	459	+0.2%
1921	404	−12.0%
1930	375	−7.2%
1950	266	−29.1%
1961	239	−10.2%
1970	193	−19.2%
1980	175	−9.3%
1991	165	−5.7%
2001	140	−15.2%
2011	135	−3.6%
2021	133	−1.5%
Source: Censuses
