= Dražice (Tábor District) =

- Municipality
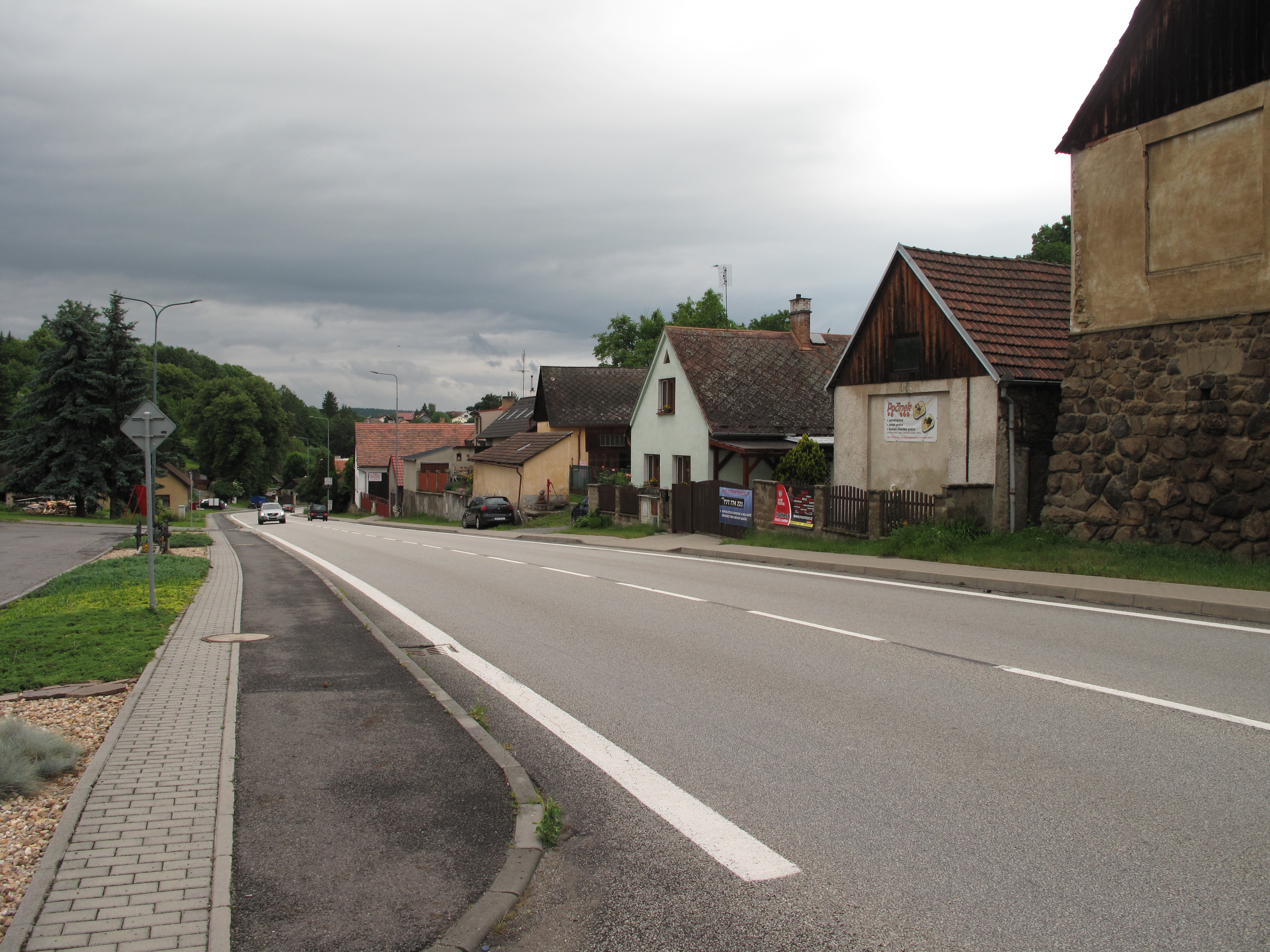
- Main road

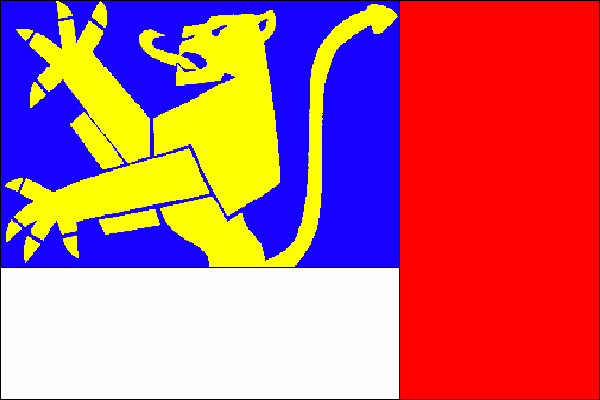
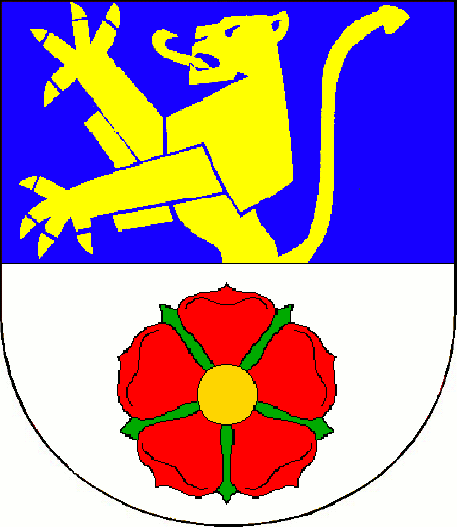
- Flag Coat of arms

- Location in the Czech Republic
- Coordinates: 49°25′46″N 14°35′24″E
- Country: Czech Republic
- Region: South Bohemian
- District: Tábor
- First mentioned: 1352

Area
  - Total: 12.98 km^{2} (5.01 sq mi)
- Elevation: 465 m (1,526 ft)

Population (2026-01-01)
  - Total: 859
  - Density: 66.2/km^{2} (171/sq mi)
- Time zone: UTC+1 (CET)
  - Summer (DST): UTC+2 (CEST)
- Postal code: 391 31
- Website: www.obecdrazice.cz

Dražice is a municipality and village in Tábor District in the South Bohemian Region of the Czech Republic. It has about 900 inhabitants.

Dražice lies approximately 6 kilometres (4 mi) west of Tábor, 51 km (32 mi) north of České Budějovice, and 75 km (47 mi) south of Prague.

== Demographics ==
Historical population
Year	Pop.	±%
1869	694	—
1880	854	+23.1%
1890	932	+9.1%
1900	869	−6.8%
1910	772	−11.2%
1921	755	−2.2%
1930	724	−4.1%
1950	561	−22.5%
1961	514	−8.4%
1970	474	−7.8%
1980	501	+5.7%
1991	570	+13.8%
2001	678	+18.9%
2011	798	+17.7%
2021	826	+3.5%
Source: Censuses
