= Aristolochus =

Aristolochus (Ancient Greek: Ἀριστόλοχος) is the name of at least two people of ancient history and mythology:

- Aristolochus of Achaea, mythological soldier slain by Aeneas
- Aristolochus (poet), possibly non-existent Greek poet
