= Portrait of Isabella of Portugal (van Eyck) =

Painting by Jan van Eyck

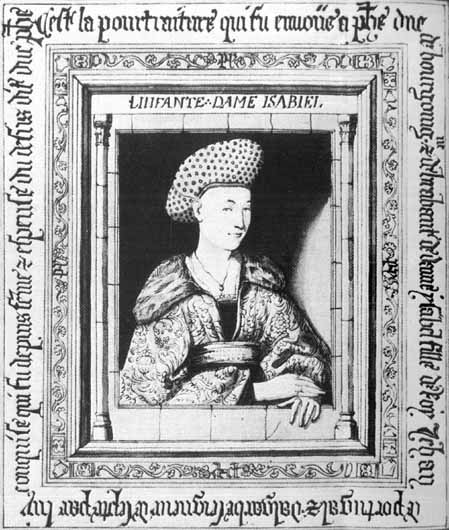
Copy after van Eyck, Isabella of Portugal van Eyck. Private collection, date disputed.

Portrait of Isabella of Portugal was a betrothal painting by the early Netherlandish artist Jan van Eyck that was one of his earliest known works, but is now lost and known only from copies. It dates from his 1428-29 visit to Portugal on behalf of Philip the Good, when he was sent as part of an embassy to evaluate the then 30-year-old Isabella's suitability as a bride for Philip.

== Commission ==
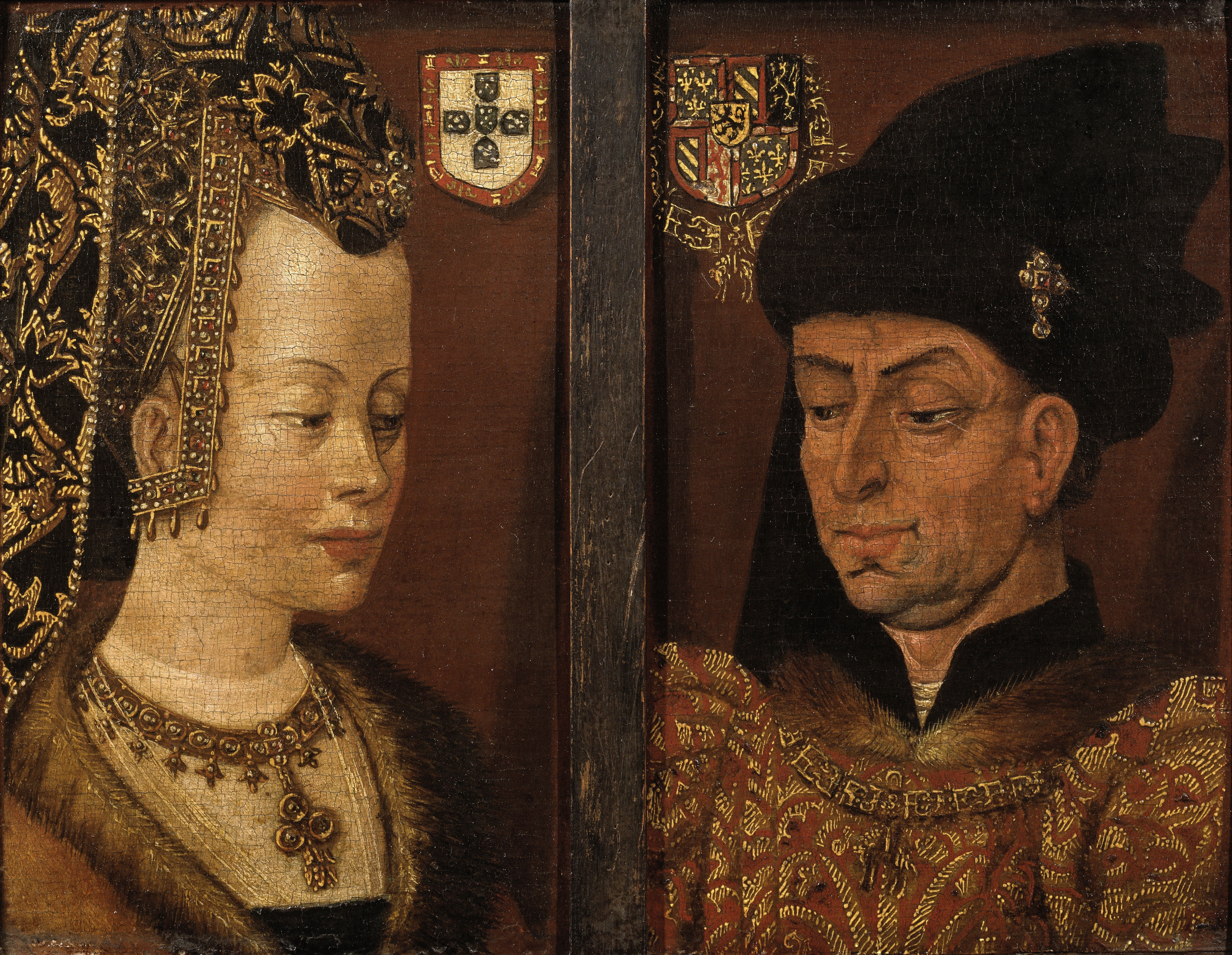
Later diptych showing Isabella of Portugal and Philip the Good in middle age

Van Eyck was tasked by Philip the Good with bringing back two (most likely a pair were painted to increase the probability that one would make it back to the Netherlands) faithful representations of her likeness for the duke to evaluate.

Because Portugal was riddled with plague, their court was itinerant and the Dutch party met them at the out-of-the-way castle of Aviz. Van Eyck spent nine months there, returning successfully to the Netherlands with Isabella as a bride-to-be; the couple married on Christmas Day of 1429.

The portrait was executed as the preliminary marriage agreement was drawn up, and would have been sent to Philip along with the document of agreement. In this, it was intended as eyewitness testimony to the "person of the princess", providing independent verification of her identity when she later travelled to Philip in Burgundy.

== Description ==
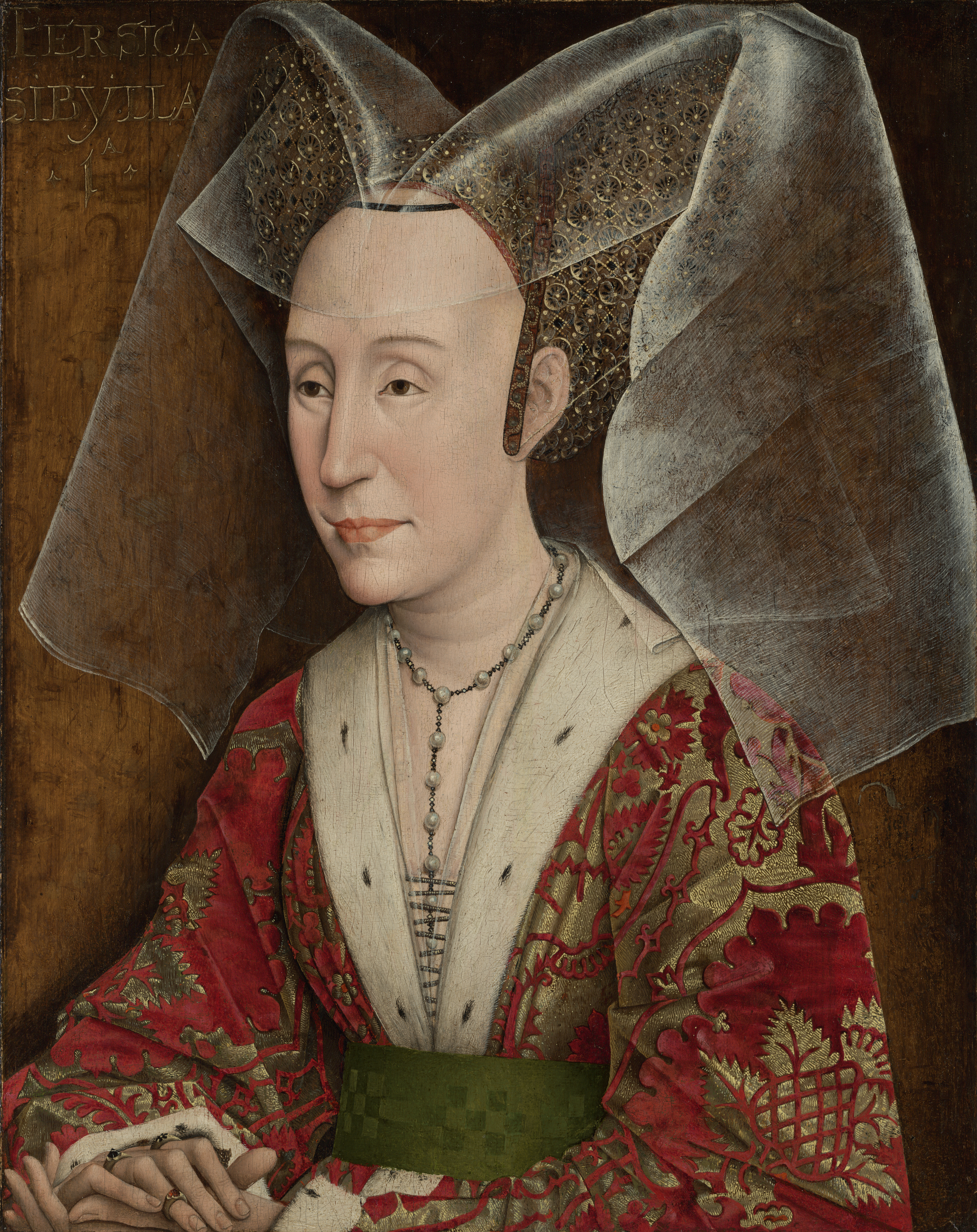
Isabella of Portugal, attributed to the workshop of Rogier van der Weyden, c 1445/50

Portrait of Isabella of Portugal is especially notable for the forward way in which she places her hand over the faux stone parapet. With this gesture Isabella extends her presence out of the pictorial space and into that of the viewer. This illusionistic motif was later developed in his London Léal Souvenir, where the subject's arm rests on the painting's lower left frame as if the subject had just suddenly and informally arrived to the sitting and casually positioned herself. This conceit was later and most famously emulated by Petrus Christus's Portrait of a Carthusian's which placed a fly perched on the faux center lower border of his canvas. Van Eyck had already gone further than this, however, and has, in this portrait, created a number of illusionistic perspectives.

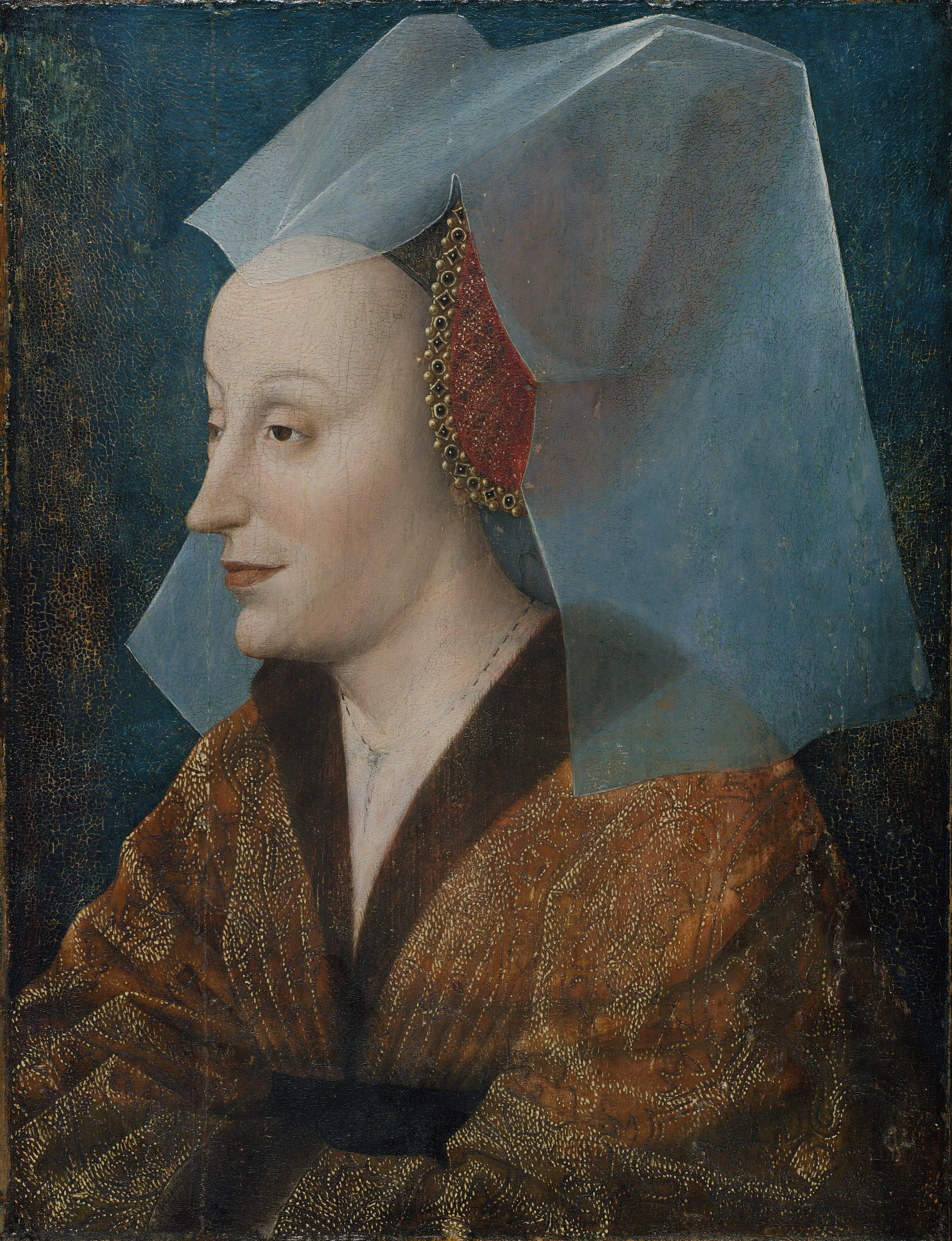
Probable portrait of Isabella of Portugal by an unknown northern artist in the mid-15th century. The woman's veil is transparent silk - most likely supplied by Giovanni di Nicolao Arnolfini

From surviving copies, it can be deduced that apart from the actual oak frame, there were two other 'painted on' frames, one of which was lettered with inscription the top, while a faux stone parapet provided support for her hands to rest upon.

Van Eyck painted a second portrait during his visit to Portugal, his 1428 Portrait of a Man with a Blue Chaperon. Art historians tend to look to this work to deduce how the Isabella portrait may have looked. The Blue Hood painting is rendered in a miniaturist scale, presumably so as to make it easier to ship back to Bruges, so it is reasonable to assume the future Queen's portrait was of much the same scale.

Although the original is today known only from a few copies, van Eyck was a renowned and widely copied artist at the time, and its probable influence can be seen in paintings of the queen by Rogier van der Weyden, as well as in a mid-15th century depiction of her by an unknown northern artist; although both works show Isabella at a much older age.

== Sources ==
- Bauman, Guy. "Early Flemish Portraits 1425–1525". The Metropolitan Museum of Art Bulletin, Vol. 43, no. 4, Spring, 1986
- Pächt, Otto. Van Eyck and the Founders of Early Netherlandish Painting. 1999. London: Harvey Miller Publishers. ISBN 1-872501-28-1
- Richardson, Carol. Locating Renaissance Art: Renaissance Art Reconsidered. Yale University Press, 2007. ISBN 0-300-12188-1
- Seidel, Linda. "The Value of Verisimilitude in the Art of Jan Van Eyck". "Yale French Studies"; Contexts: Style and Values in Medieval Art and Literature, 1991.
