= Woman Bathing (van Eyck) =

Painting by Jan van Eyck

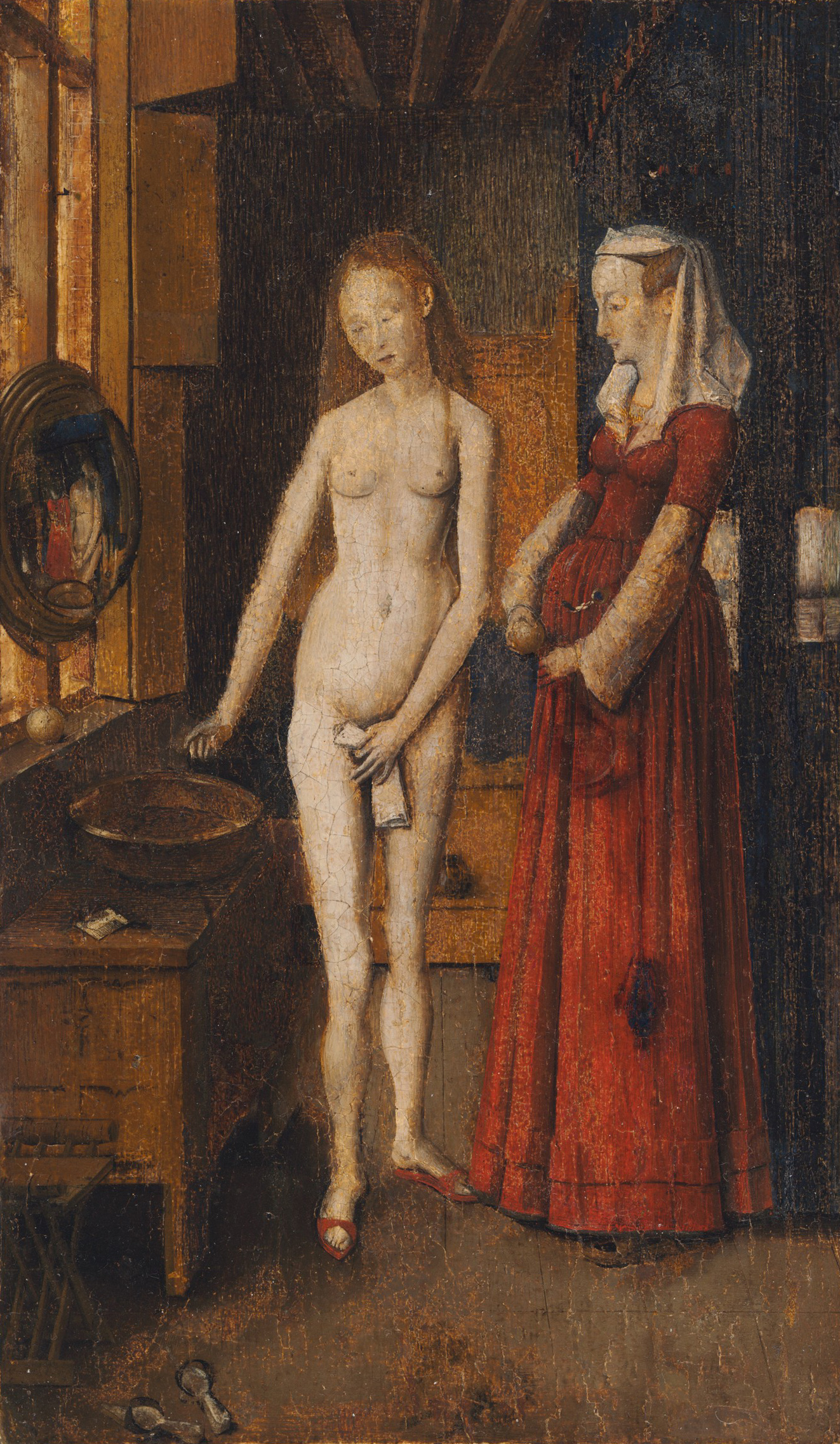
Woman at Her Toilet, early 16th-century copy by an unknown Netherlandish artist, 27.2 x 16.3 cm. Harvard Art Museums/Fogg Museum, MA.

Woman Bathing (or Woman at Her Toilet, sometimes Bathsheba at Her Toilet) is a lost early 15th century panel painting by the Early Netherlandish artist Jan van Eyck. It is known through two copies which diverge in important aspects; one in Antwerp and a more successful but smaller c. 1500 panel in Harvard University's Fogg Museum, which is in poor condition. It is unique in van Eyck's known oeuvre for portraying a nude in secular setting, although there is mention in two 17th-century literary sources of other now lost but equally erotic van Eyck panels.

The attribution of either panel to an original by van Eyck is usually not contested; while it may be doubted whether either copy was completed until one or two generations after his early death c. 1441, it is accepted that neither is a forgery or wishful thinking. Art historians broadly consider it likely that both were copied from a single source, that is, one is not a copy of the other, and that both originate from roughly the same period.

Van Eyck's original was atypically daring and unusually erotic for a painting of the 1420s – early 1430s when it was presumably completed. Apart from its own qualities, it is interesting to art historians due to the many similarities of the Harvard panel to his famous 1434 London Arnolfini Portrait. Until the emergence of the Fogg copy around 1969, it was known mostly through its appearance in Willem van Haecht's expansive 1628 painting The Gallery of Cornelis van der Geest, a view of a collector's gallery which contains many other identifiable old masters. Art historians have sought in vain to attach to either a biblical or classical source; the rapes of Bathsheba or Susanna have been suggested, although Judith is sometimes seen a more likely source, but the clues apply only to the Antwerp panel, traditionally known as "Judith Beautifying Herself".

== Description ==
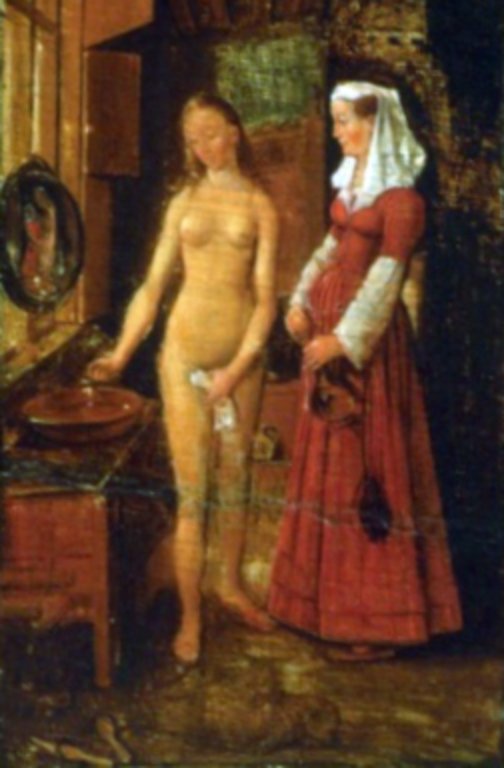
Detail: Willem van Haecht, Art-Gallery of Cornelis van der Geest, 1628

It shows a nude woman taking a sponge bath in an interior setting accompanied by a maid in a red gown. The woman preserves her modesty with a washcloth held in her left hand as she reaches with her right towards a basin placed on a side table. A convex mirror hangs from a central bar in the shuttered window above the basin and shows the reflection of both figures. In the tradition of such scenes, the mirror symbolises virtue and purity, while the dog in the lower center at the woman's feet – barely visible in the Fogg panel due to loss of paint, but more distinguishable in van der Geest's work – represents her fidelity. Her bedchamber is richly detailed; there is a wooden bed to the right, a tall folding chair against the back wall, and wooden beams running across the ceiling. An orange rests on the windowsill, and there are discarded pattens on the floor in the lower left corner.

Two other possible works by van Eyck of this style are known from descriptions only. In 1456, the Italian humanist Bartolomeo Facio described a panel in the collection of Ottaviano della Carda, a nephew of Federico da Montefeltro. In the panel, sometimes known as Bathing Woman, the woman is attended by an older clothed maid as she emerges from her bath in a veil of fine linen which leaves only her head and breasts exposed. Facio's description includes details of a dog, a burning lamp similar to the one in the Arnolfini Portrait, and a distant landscape visible through an open window. Facio mentions the innovative use of a mirror, which in the work is full length and reflects the entire back of the woman's body.

== Arnolfini portrait ==
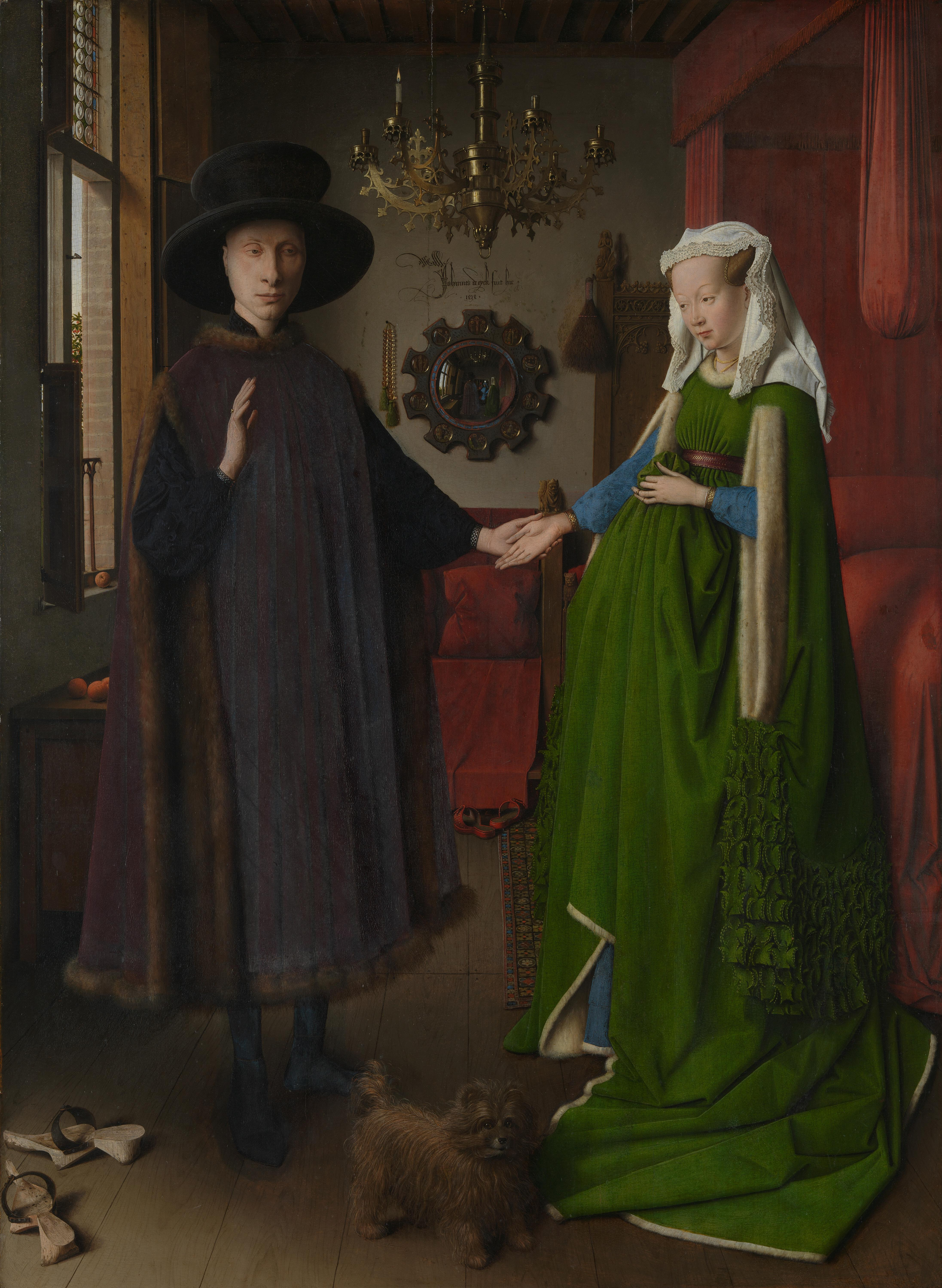
Arnolfini Portrait, 1434. National Gallery, London.

There are many similarities, especially with the Fogg panel, to van Eyck's famous London Arnolfini Portrait. While the former is much narrower and much smaller at 27.2 cm x 16.3 cm, it is around a third the size of the London portrait (without frame 82.6 cm x 60 cm). van Haecht's reproduction is thought closer to the actual scale than the Fogg panel, especially given that the other works in The Gallery of Cornelis van der Geest are in general very close to the originals that survived or had their dimensions recorded. Given that van Haecht did not give the work an especially prominent position in his own painting, it is unlikely that he was exaggerating its importance, so it might be reasonably deduced that it was not much smaller than this representation.

Both the Fogg and London panels show an interior containing a bed and a small dog (probably an early form of the breed now known as the Brussels griffon), a mirror and its reflection, a chest of drawers and clogs on the floor, while the angle the attendant woman faces from, and her dress and the outline of her figure, are broadly similar. Art historian Linda Seidel speculates that it was created as an accompanying panel, and that the pair were intended as betrothal paintings. The London panel, she observes, may have been "painted for the wall of Giovanna Cenami's father's house where she would have seen it in the years between her betrothal and her marriage ... perhaps ... the erotic half may have been given to her future husband as a guarantee of what he was promised". Seidel believes that the pattens at the lower left hand corner of the panel, as well as the fact that the mirror is angled towards the viewer's point of view, reinforce the idea that a future husband was the intended audience. She notes the work's unusually steep perspective, and concludes that the "panel's controlling gaze align[ed] it with the mirror's reflection of the woman's naked body". Although variants of this view have been long maintained, they are complicated by the fact that the similarities apply to the Harvard panel only.

Lorne Campbell of the National Gallery is not convinced by the functional connection. While he acknowledges the similarities between the works, he points out that the Arnolfini has not conclusively been established as a wedding portrait, and that even if this was the case, it is more likely that the London panel was originally covered by wings rather than by a single panel. He reinforces his view with the fact the lost work differs in two important aspects: that the bed curtains are not red, and that the mirror is not decorated. Campbell rejects the similarities as "coincidental", although it might be better argued that the lost work was a prototype or study. Julius S. Held believed that the Fogg panel was created as a cover for the London painting, an idea that held traction until rejected by Campbell in 1988 when he argued that such a painting was more likely to be covered by wings than a single piece, and that further the London panel in probability does not depict or commemorate either a marriage or betrothal.
