= Franciscus Aretinus =

Franciscus Aretinus or Francesco Aretino may refer to:

- Francesco Griffolini (born 1420), Italian humanist
- Francesco Accolti (died 1488), Italian jurist
