= Jan van Eyck =

Flemish painter (died 1441)

- Presumed Self Portrait, 1433. National Gallery, London
- Born: Sometime around 1380 or 1390; Maaseik, Prince-Bishopric of Liège
- Died: 9 July 1441; Bruges, Burgundian Netherlands
- Education: Robert Campin (disputed)
- Movement: Early Netherlandish painting, Northern Renaissance
- Patrons: John III, Duke of Bavaria, later Philip the Good

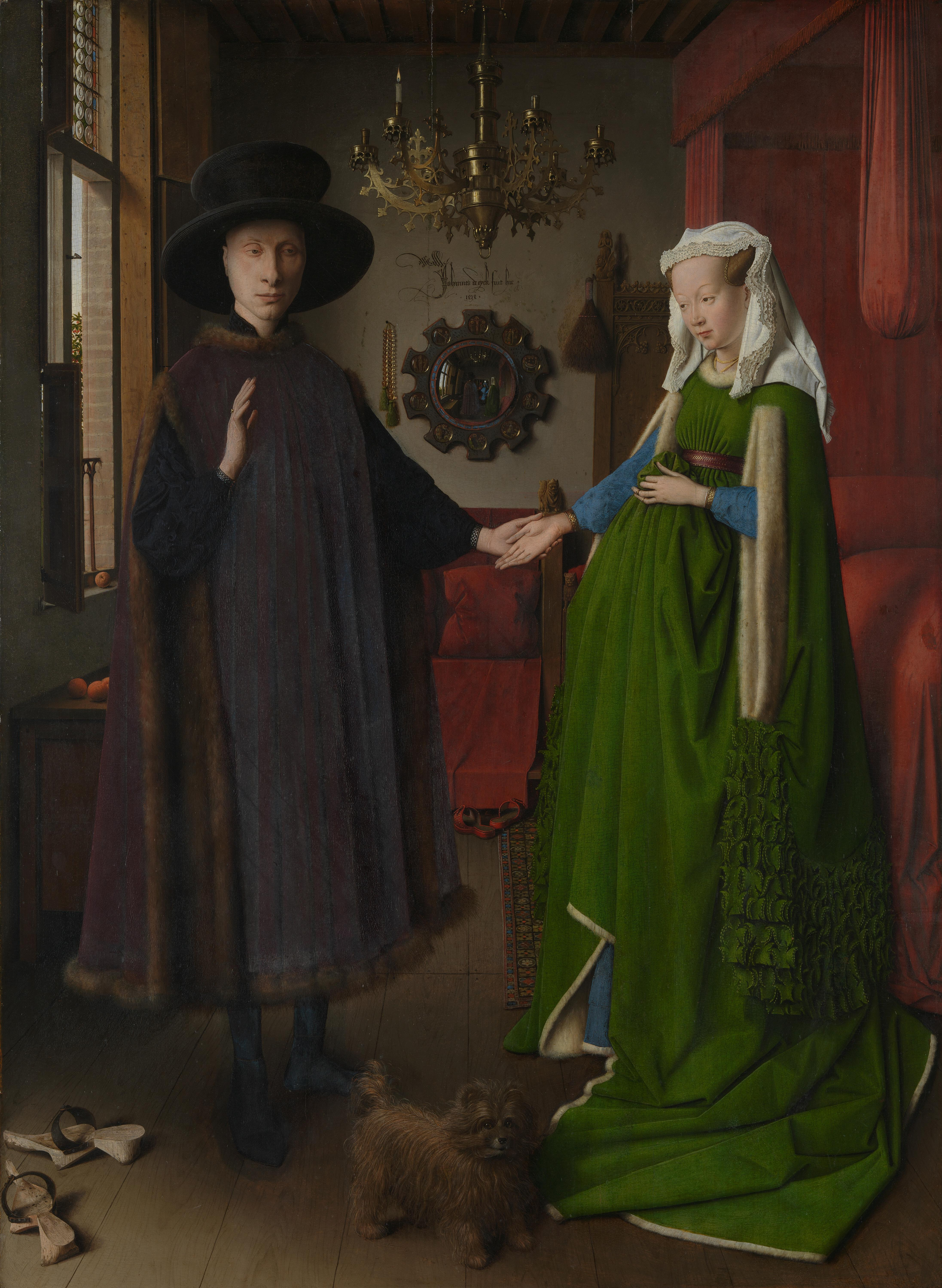
The Arnolfini Portrait, oil on oak, 1434. National Gallery, London

Jan van Eyck (/væn ˈaɪk/ van EYEK; Dutch: [ˈjɑɱ vɑn ˈɛik]; c. before 1390 – 9 July 1441) was an early Netherlandish painter active in Bruges who was one of the early innovators of what became known as early Netherlandish painting, and one of the supreme figures of the Early Northern Renaissance. Such was his legacy, that he has been called "the inventor of oil-painting" by Vasari, Ernst Gombrich, and others, although this claim is now considered an oversimplification.

Surviving records date his birth at around 1380 or 1390, in Maaseik (then Maaseyck, hence his name) by the Limburg in present-day Belgium. He took employment in The Hague around 1422, when he was already a master painter with workshop assistants, and was employed as painter and valet de chambre to John III the Pitiless, ruler of the counties of Holland and Hainaut. Some time after John's death in 1425, he was appointed as court painter to Philip the Good, Duke of Burgundy, and worked in Lille before moving to Bruges in 1429, where he lived until his death. He was highly regarded by Philip, and was dispatched on several diplomatic visits abroad, including one to Lisbon in 1428 to discuss the possibility of a marriage contract between the duke and Isabella of Portugal.

About 20 surviving paintings are confidently attributed to him, as well as the Ghent Altarpiece and the illuminated miniatures of the Turin-Milan Hours, all dated between 1432 and 1439. Ten are dated and signed with a variation of his motto ALS ICH KAN (As I (Eyck) can), a pun on his name, which he typically painted in Greek characters.

Van Eyck painted both secular and religious subjects. His works include altarpieces, painted panels—diptychs (dismantled), triptychs, and polyptychs—and commissioned portraits. He was well paid by Philip, who wanted the painter to have the financial security and artistic freedom to paint "whenever he pleased." Van Eyck's early work shows influence from the International Gothic style, which he soon eclipsed, in part through a greater emphasis on naturalism and realism. He achieved a new level of virtuosity through his developments in the use of oil paint. His style and techniques profoundly altered the development of the Early Netherlandish school.

== Life and career ==
=== Early life ===
Little is known of Jan van Eyck's early life and neither the date nor place of his birth is documented. The first extant record of his life comes from the court of John of Bavaria at The Hague where, between 1422 and 1424, payments were made to Meyster Jan den malre (Master Jan the painter) who was then a court painter with the rank of valet de chambre, with at first one and then two assistants. This suggests a date of birth of 1395 at the latest. However, some scholars have argued it was closer to 1380. He was identified in the late 16th century as having been born in Maaseik, a borough of the prince-bishopric of Liège. His daughter Lievine was in a nunnery in Maaseik after her father's death. The notes on his preparatory drawing for Portrait of Cardinal Niccolò Albergati are written in the Maasland dialect.

Van Eyck is known to have had two brothers, Hubert, who died in 1426 and with whom Jan probably served his apprenticeship and Lambert (active between 1431 and 1442), both also painters. The order of their births has not been established, though Alfred Acres states that Hubert was probably older than Jan. Van Eyck may also have had a sister, Margaret, also a painter, though her existence is uncertain and "could reflect a historical confusion with Jan's wife" Margaret. Another significant, and rather younger, painter who worked in Southern France, Barthélemy van Eyck, is presumed to be a relation. It is not known where Jan was educated, but he had knowledge of Latin and used the Greek and Hebrew alphabets in his inscriptions, indicating that he was schooled in the classics. This level of education was rare among painters, and would have made him more attractive to the cultivated Philip.

=== Court painter ===
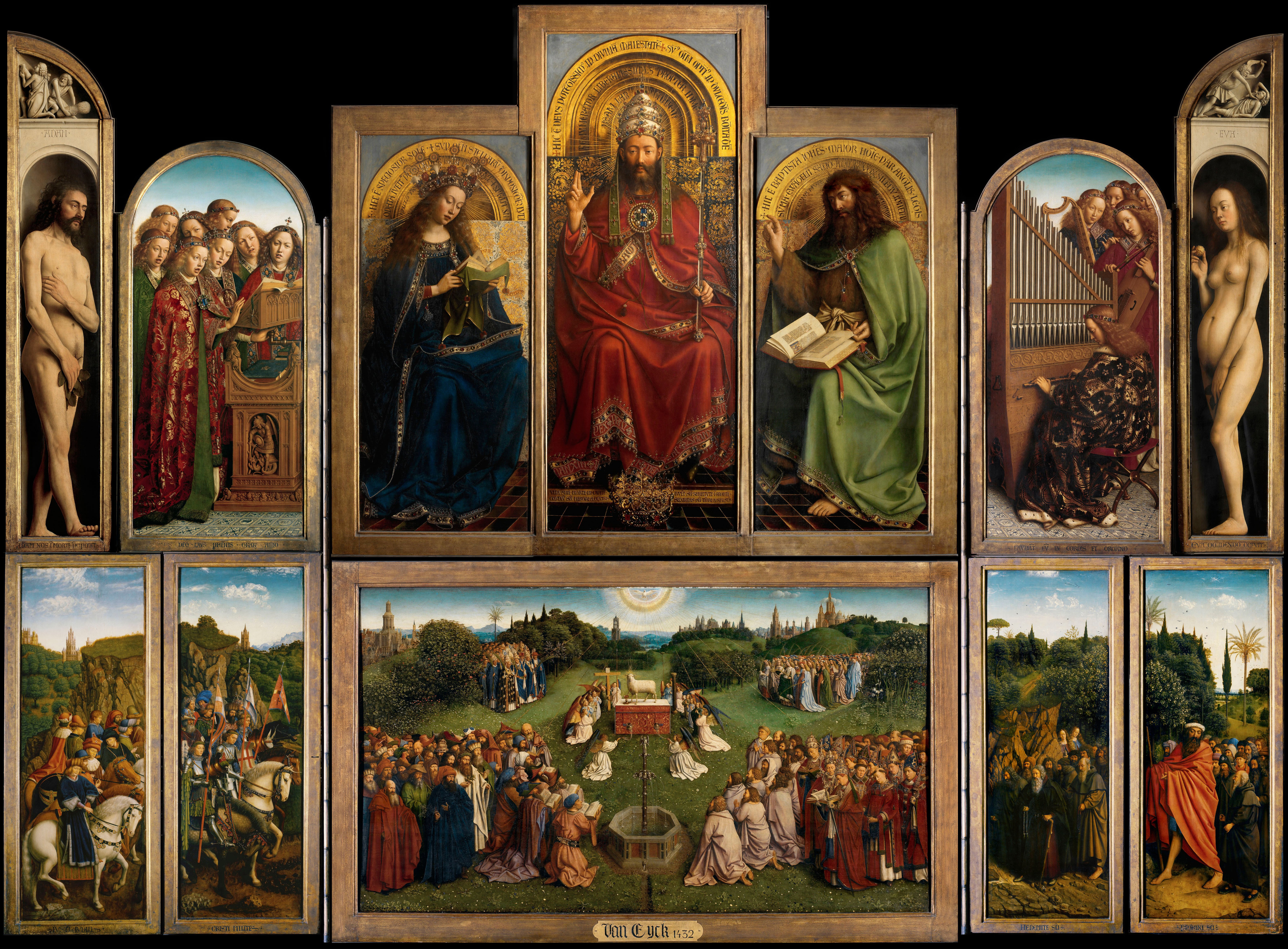
Hubert and Jan van Eyck, Ghent Altarpiece, completed 1432. Saint Bavo Cathedral, Ghent

Van Eyck served as official to John of Bavaria-Straubing, ruler of Holland, Hainault and Zeeland. By this time he had assembled a small workshop and was involved in redecorating the Binnenhof palace in The Hague. After John's death in 1425 he moved to Bruges and came to the attention of Philip the Good c. 1425. His emergence as a collectable painter generally follows his appointment to Philip's court, and from this point his activity in the court is comparatively well documented. He served as court artist and diplomat, and was a senior member of the Tournai painters' guild. On 18 October 1427, the Feast of St. Luke, he travelled to Tournai to attend a banquet in his honour, also attended by Robert Campin and Rogier van der Weyden.

A court salary freed him from commissioned work, and allowed a large degree of artistic freedom. Over the following decade Van Eyck's reputation and technical ability grew, mostly from his innovative approaches towards the handling and manipulating of oil paint. Unlike most of his peers, his reputation never diminished and he remained well regarded over the following centuries. His revolutionary approach to oil was such that a myth, perpetuated by Giorgio Vasari, arose that he had invented oil painting. (Note: The myth was propagated by Karel van Mander. In fact oil painting as a technique for painting wood statues and other objects is much older and Theophilus (Roger of Helmarshausen?) clearly gives instructions in his 1125 treatise, On Divers Arts. It is accepted that the van Eyck brothers were among the earliest Early Netherlandish painters to employ it for detailed panel paintings and that they achieved new and unforeseen effects through the use of glazes, wet-on-wet and other techniques. See Gombrich, E. H., The Story of Art, 236–39. Phaidon, 1995. ISBN 0-7148-3355-X)

His brother Hubert van Eyck collaborated on Jan's most famous work, the Ghent Altarpiece. Art historians believe it was begun c. 1420 by Hubert and completed in 1432 by Jan. Another brother, Lambert, is mentioned in Burgundian court documents and, probably in partnership with Jan's widow, may have overseen his brother's workshop after Jan's death.

=== Maturity and success ===
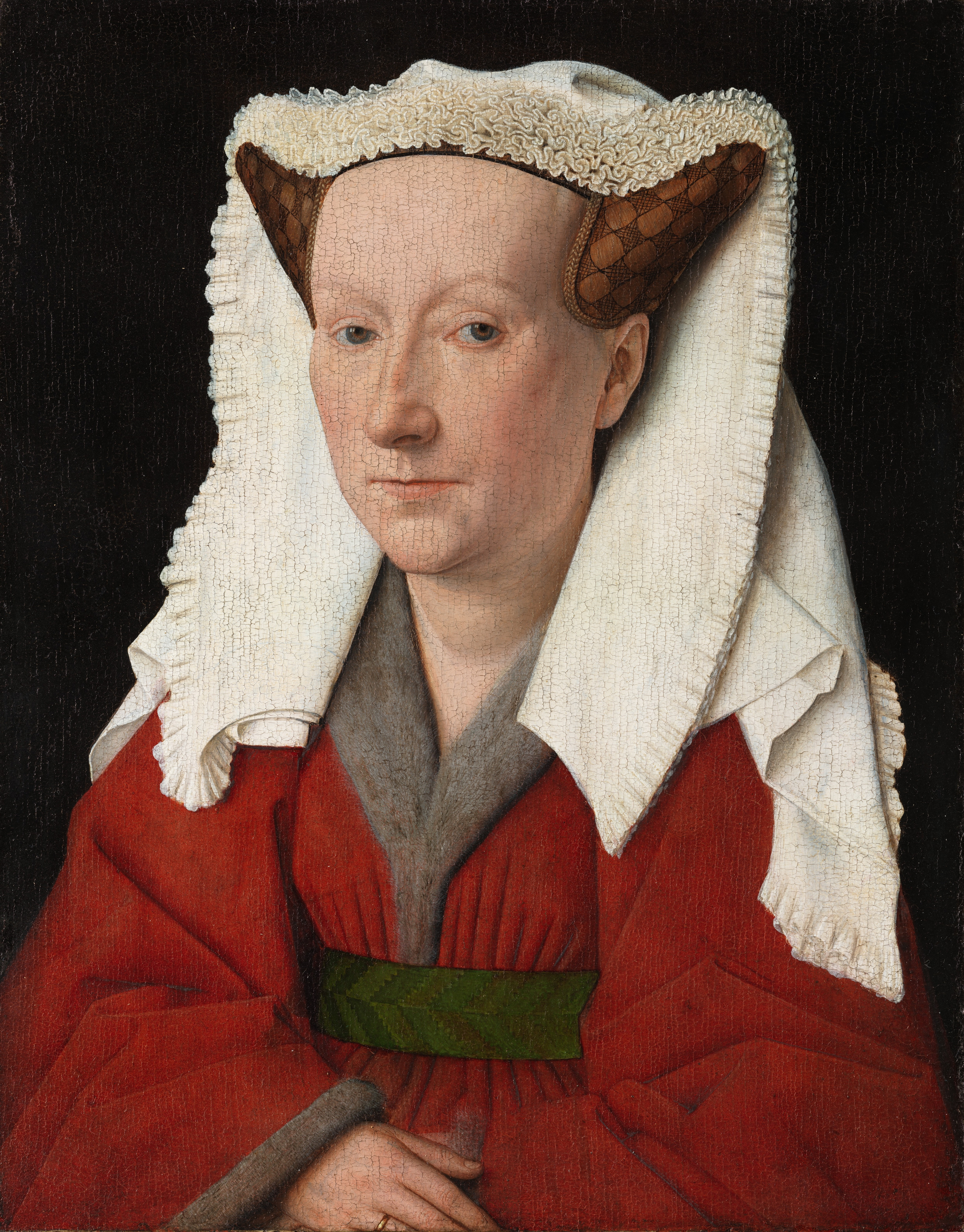
Portrait of Margaret van Eyck, Groeningemuseum, Bruges, 1439

Considered revolutionary within his lifetime, Van Eyck's designs and methods were heavily copied and reproduced. His motto, one of the first and still most distinctive signatures in art history, ALS ICH KAN ("AS I CAN"), a pun on his name, first appeared in 1433 on Portrait of a Man in a Turban, which can be seen as indicating his emerging self-confidence. The years between 1434 and 1436, when he produced the Madonna of Chancellor Rolin, Lucca Madonna and Virgin and Child with Canon van der Paele, are generally considered his high point.

Around 1432, he married Margaret who was 15 years younger. At about the same time he bought a house in Bruges; Margaret is unmentioned before he relocated, when the first of their two children was born in 1434. Very little is known of Margaret; even her maiden name is lost – contemporary records refer to her mainly as Damoiselle Marguerite. She may have been of aristocratic birth, though from the lower nobility, as evidenced from her clothes in the portrait, which are fashionable but not of the sumptuousness worn by the bride in the Arnolfini Portrait. Later, as the widow of a renowned painter Margaret was afforded a modest pension by the city of Bruges. At least some of this income was invested in lottery.

Van Eyck undertook a number of journeys on Philip the Duke of Burgundy's behalf between 1426 and 1429, described in records as "secret" commissions, for which he was paid multiples of his annual salary. Their precise nature is still unknown, but they seem to involve his acting as envoy of the court. In 1426 he departed for "certain distant lands", possibly to the Holy Land, a theory given weight by the topographical accuracy of Jerusalem in The Three Marys at the Tomb, a painting completed by members of his workshop c. 1440.

A better documented commission was the journey to Lisbon along with a group intended to prepare the ground for the Duke's wedding to Isabella of Portugal. Van Eyck was tasked with painting the bride, so that the Duke could visualise her before their marriage. Because Portugal was riddled with plague, their court was itinerant and the Dutch party met them at the out-of-the-way castle of Avis. Van Eyck spent nine months there, returning to the Netherlands with Isabella as a bride to be; the couple married on Christmas Day of 1429. It would have been a challenging task in that Van Eyck would have to be honest as to Isabella’s appearance, whilst also pleasing the model herself. Typically he showed his sitters as dignified, yet did not hide their imperfections. After his return, he was preoccupied with completing the Ghent Altarpiece, which was consecrated on 6 May 1432 at Saint Bavo Cathedral during an official ceremony for Philip. Records from 1437 say that he was held in high esteem by the upper ranks of Burgundian nobility and was employed in foreign commissions.

=== Death and legacy ===
Annunciation, 1434–1436; National Gallery of Art, Washington

Jan van Eyck died on 9 July 1441, in Bruges. He was buried in the graveyard of the Church of St Donatian. As a mark of respect, Philip made a one-off payment to Jan's widow Margaret, to a value equal to the artist's annual salary. He left behind many unfinished works to be completed by his workshop journeymen. After his death, Lambert van Eyck ran the workshop, as Jan's reputation and stature steadily grew. Early in 1442 Lambert had the body exhumed and placed inside St. Donatian's Cathedral.

In 1449 he was mentioned by the Italian humanist and antiquarian Ciriaco de' Pizzicolli as a painter of note and ability, and was recorded by Bartolomeo Facio in 1456.

== Works ==
Jan van Eyck produced paintings for private clients in addition to his work at the court. Foremost among these is the Ghent Altarpiece painted for the merchant, financier and politician Jodocus Vijdts and his wife Elisabeth Borluut. Started sometime before 1426 and completed by 1432, the polyptych is seen as representing "the final conquest of reality in the North", differing from the great works of the Early Renaissance in Italy by virtue of its willingness to forgo classical idealisation in favor of the faithful observation of nature.

Even though it may be assumed – given the demand and fashion – that he produced a number of triptychs, only the Dresden altarpiece survives, although a number of extant portraits may be wings of dismantled polyptychs. Telltale signs are hinges on original frames, the sitter's orientation, and praying hands or the inclusion of iconographical elements in an otherwise seemingly secular portrait.

About 20 surviving paintings are confidently attributed to him, all dated between 1432 and 1439. Ten, including the Ghent Altarpiece, are dated and signed with a variation of his motto, ALS ICH KAN. In 1998 Holland Cotter estimated that "only two dozen or so paintings...attributed...with varying degrees of confidence, along with some drawings and a few pages from...the Turin-Milan Hours." He described the "complex relationship and tension between art historians and holding museums in assigning authorship. Of the 40 or so works considered originals in the mid '80s, around ten are now vigorously contested by leading researchers as workshop."

=== Turin-Milan Hours: Hand G ===
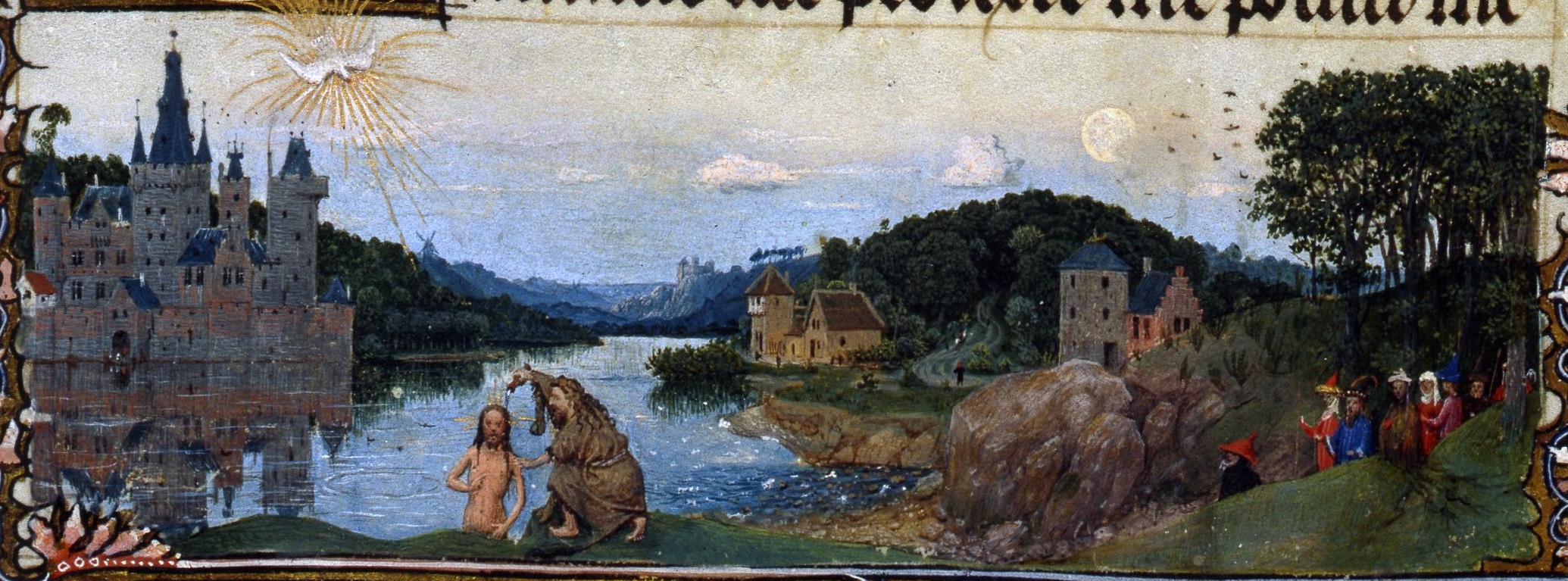
Bas-de-page of the Baptism of Christ, Hand G, Turin. Milan Filio 93v, Inv 47.

Since 1901 Jan van Eyck has often been credited as the anonymous artist known as Hand G of the Turin-Milan Hours. (Note: It is also possible that Hand G was a follower of Van Eyck's. See Campbell (1998), 174) If this is correct, the Turin illustrations are the only known works from his early period; according to Thomas Kren the earlier dates for Hand G precede any known panel painting in an Eyckian style, which "raise[s] provocative questions about the role that manuscript illumination may have played in the vaunted verisimilitude of Eyckian oil painting."

The evidence for attributing Van Eyck rests on part on the fact that although the figures are mostly of the International Gothic type, they reappear in some of his later work. In addition, there are coats of arms connected with the Wittelsbach family with whom he had connections in the Hague, while some of the figures in the miniatures echo the horsemen in the Ghent Altarpiece.

Most of the Turin-Milan Hours were destroyed by fire in 1904 and survive only in photographs and copies; only three pages at most attributed to Hand G now survive, those with large miniatures of the Birth of John the Baptist, the Finding of the True Cross and the Office of the Dead (or Requiem Mass), with the bas-de-page miniatures and initials of the first and last of these (Note: bas-de-page refers to often unframed images illuminating the bottom of a page.) The Office of the Dead is often seen as recalling Jan's 1438–1440 Madonna in the Church. Four more were lost in 1904: all the elements of the pages with the miniatures called The Prayer on the Shore (or Duke William of Bavaria at the Seashore, the Sovereign's prayer etc.), and the night-scene of the Betrayal of Christ (which was already described by Durrieu as "worn" before the fire), the Coronation of the Virgin and its bas-de-page, and the large picture only of the seascape Voyage of St Julian & St Martha. (Note: Kren (2003), 84, note 1. Châtelet, 34–35 and 194–196 – all except the Coronation are illustrated there. The titles vary between authors. Châtelet additionally credits Hand G with parts of The Intercession of Christ and the Virgin in the Louvre (p.195))

=== Marian iconography ===
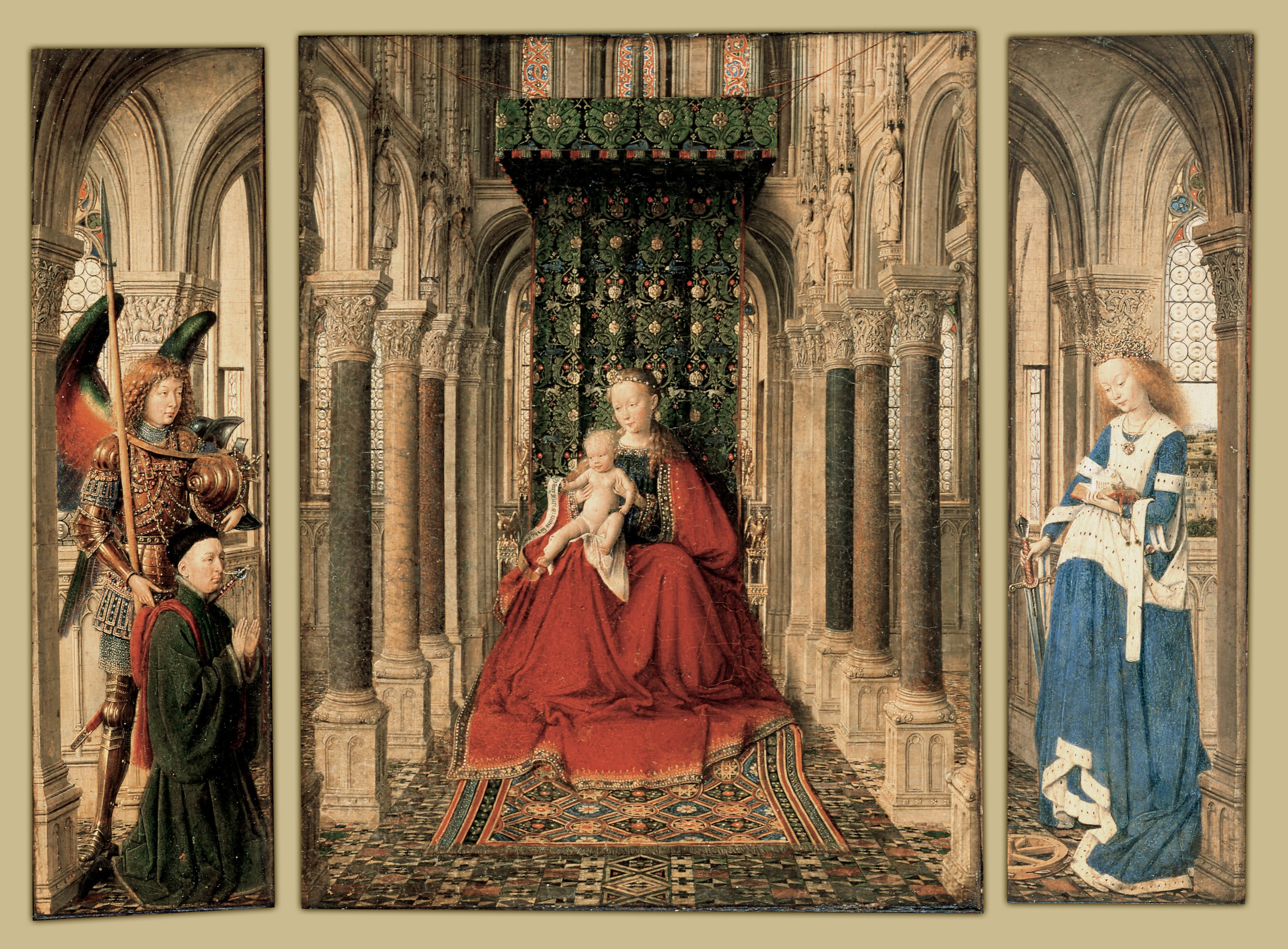
Dresden Triptych. Oil on oak panel, 1437. Gemäldegalerie Alte Meister, Dresden

Except the 'Ghent Altarpiece,' Van Eyck's religious works feature the Virgin Mary as the central figure. She is typically seated, wearing a jewel-studded crown, cradling a playful child Christ who gazes at her and grips the hem of her dress in a manner that recalls the 13th-century Byzantine tradition of the Eleusa icon (Virgin of Tenderness). She is sometimes shown reading a Book of Hours. She usually wears red. In the 1432 Ghent Altarpiece Mary wears a crown adorned with flowers and stars. She is dressed as a bride, and reads from a girdle book draped with green cloth, perhaps an element borrowed from Robert Campin's Virgin Annunciate. The panel contains a number of motifs that later reappear in later works; she is already Queen of Heaven, wearing a crown adorned with flowers and stars. Van Eyck usually presents Mary as an apparition before a donor kneeling in prayer to the side. The idea of a saint appearing before a layperson was common in Northern donor portraits of the period. In Virgin and Child with Canon van der Paele (1434–1436), the Canon seems to have just paused momentarily to reflect on a passage from his hand-held bible as the Virgin and Child with two saints appear before him, as if embodiments of his prayer.

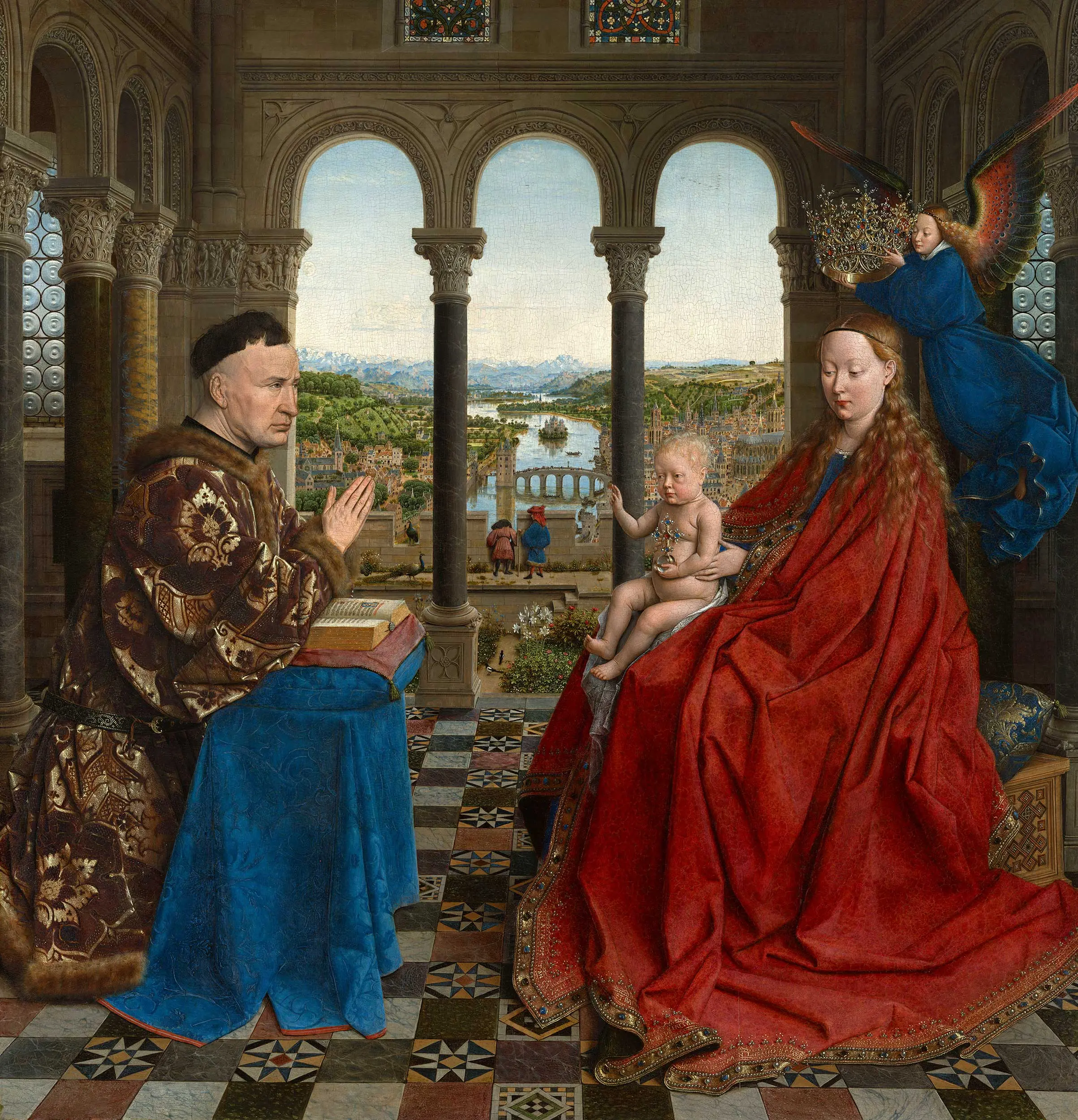
Madonna of Chancellor Rolin, c. 1435. Musée du Louvre, Paris

Mary's role in his works should be viewed in the context of the contemporary cult and veneration surrounding her. In the early 15th century Mary grew in importance as an intercessor between the divine and members of the Christian faith. The concept of purgatory as an intermediary state that each soul had to pass through before admission to heaven was at its height. Prayer was the most obvious means of decreasing time in limbo, while the wealthy could commission new churches, extensions to existing ones, or devotional portraits. At the same time, there was a trend towards the sponsorship of requiem masses, often as part of the terms of a will, a practice that Joris van der Paele actively sponsored. With this income he endowed the churches with embroidered cloths and metal accessories such as chalices, plates and candlesticks.

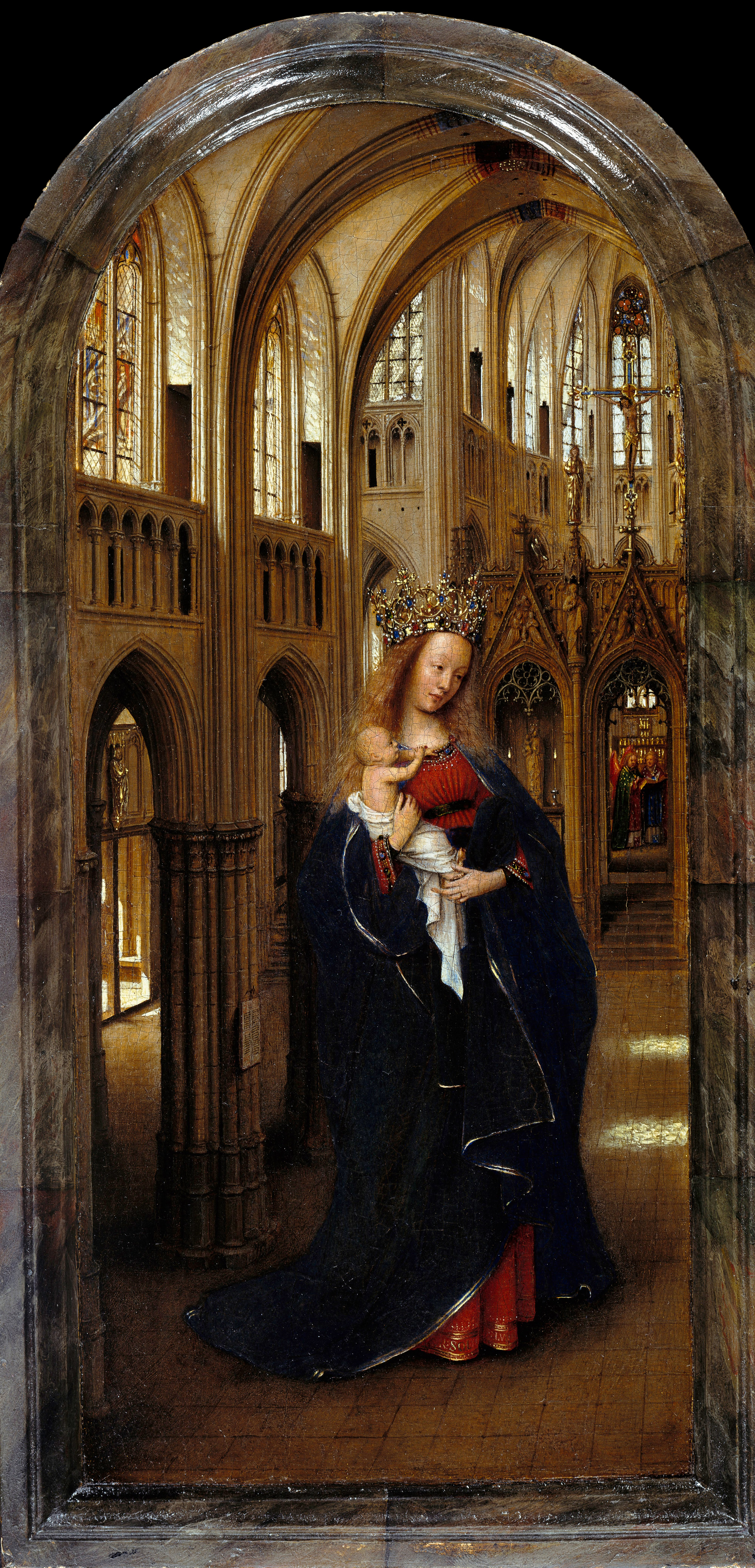
Madonna in the Church, c. 1438–1440. Gemäldegalerie, Berlin

Eyck usually gives Mary three roles: Mother of Christ; the personification of the "Ecclesia Triumphans"; or Queen of Heaven.

The idea of Mary as a metaphor for the Church itself is especially strong in his later paintings. In Madonna in the Church she dominates the cathedral; her head is almost level with the approximately sixty feet high gallery. Art historian Otto Pächt describes the interior of the panel as a "throne room" which envelops her as if a "carrying case". This distortion of scale is found in a number of other of his Madonna paintings, including Annunciation. Her monumental stature borrows from the works of 12th- and 13th-century Italian artists such as Cimabue and Giotto, who in turn reflect a tradition reaching back to an Italo-Byzantine type and emphasises her identification with the cathedral itself. Art historians in the 19th century thought the work was executed early in Van Eyck's career and attributed her scale as the mistake of a relatively immature painter. The idea that her size represents her embodiment as the church was first suggested by Erwin Panofsky in 1941. Till-Holger Borchert says that Van Eyck did not paint "the Madonna in a church", but as "the Church".

Van Eyck's later works contain very precise and detailed architectural details, but are not modeled on actual historical buildings. He probably sought to create an ideal and perfect space for Mary's apparition, and was more concerned with their visual impact rather than physical possibility.

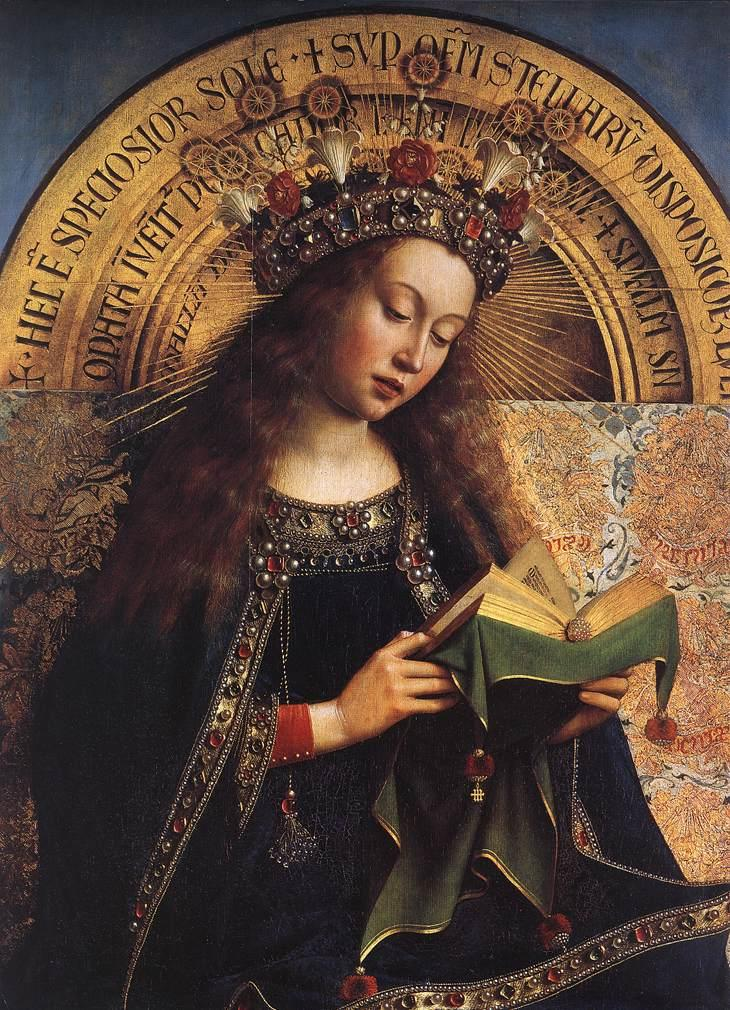
Ghent Altarpiece, detail showing the Virgin Mary

The Marian paintings are characterized by complex depictions of both physical space and light sources. Many of Van Eyck's religious works contain a reduced interior space that is nonetheless subtly managed and arranged to convey a sense of intimacy without feeling constricted. The Madonna of Chancellor Rolin is lit from both the central portico and the side windows, while the floor-tiles in comparison to other elements indicate that the figures are only about six feet from the columned loggia screen, and that Rolin might have had to squeeze himself through the opening to get out that way. The Gothic and contemporary architectural elements of the cathedral in Madonna in the Church are so minutely detailed that many art and architecture historians have concluded that he must have had enough architectural knowledge to make nuanced distinctions. Given this accuracy, many scholars have tried to link the painting with particular buildings. But in all the buildings in Van Eyck's work, the structure is imagined and probably an idealized formation of what he viewed as a perfect architectural space. This can be seen from the many examples of features that would be unlikely in a contemporary church, including the placing of a round arched triforium above a pointed colonnade in the Berlin work.

The Marian works are heavily lined with inscriptions. The lettering on the arched throne above Mary in the Ghent Altarpiece is taken from a passage from the Book of Wisdom (7:29): "She is more beautiful than the sun and the army of the stars; compared to the light she is superior. She is truly the reflection of eternal light and a spotless mirror of God". Wording from the same source on the hem of her robe, on the frame of Madonna in the Church and on her dress in Virgin and Child with Canon van der Paele, reads EST ENIM HAEC SPECIOSIOR SOLE ET SUPER OMNEM STELLARUM DISPOSITIONEM. LUCI CONPARATA INVENITUR PRIOR Although inscriptions are present in all of Van Eyck's paintings, they are predominant in his Marian paintings, where they seem to serve a number of functions. They breathe life into portraits and give voice to those venerating Mary but also play a functional role; given that contemporary religious works were commissioned for private devotion, the inscriptions may have been intended to be read as an incantation or personalized indulgence prayers. Harbison notes that Van Eyck's privately commissioned works are unusually heavily inscribed with prayer, and that the words may have served a similar function to prayer tablets, or more properly "Prayer Wings", as seen in the London Virgin and Child triptych.

=== Secular portraits ===
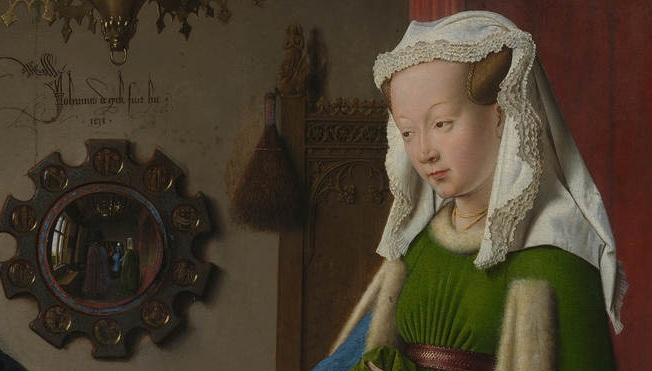
The Arnolfini Portrait, detail showing the female subject and convex mirror

Van Eyck was in high demand as a portrait artist. Growing affluence across northern Europe meant that portraiture was no longer the preserve of royalty and high aristocracy. Further raising the demand for portraits was the emergence of the merchant middle class and the growing awareness of humanist ideas of selfhood. Responding to this shift, Van Eyck used layers of thin translucent glazes that gave his paintings a rich depth of color and tone, resulting in strikingly vivid likenesses. Nine three-quarters view portraits attributed to Van Eyck survive today. His style was widely adopted, most notably by Van der Weyden, Petrus Christus and Hans Memling.

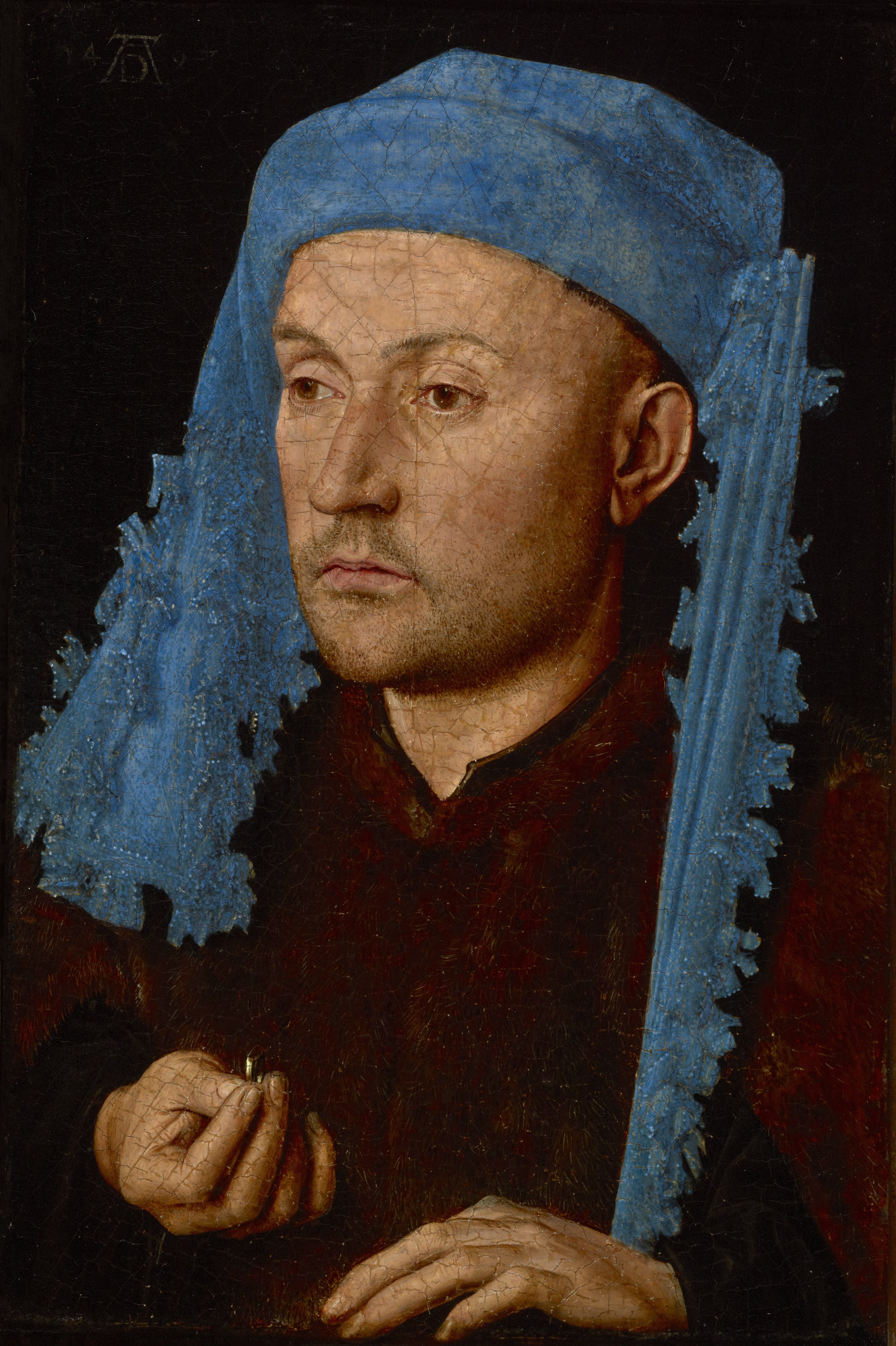
Portrait of a Man with a Blue Chaperon, 1430–1433

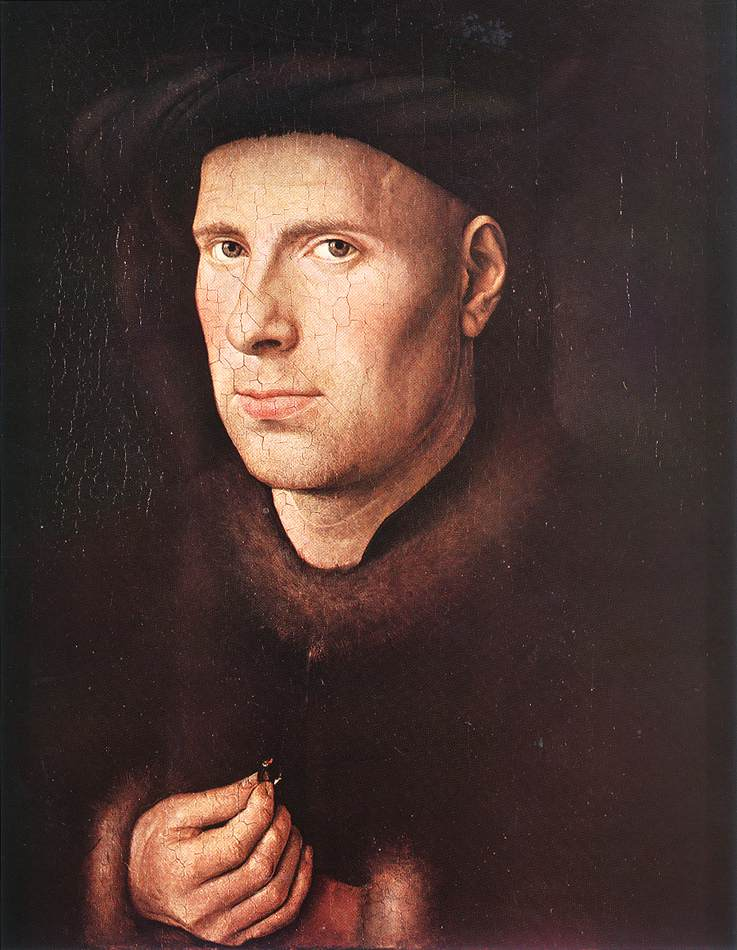
Portrait of Jan de Leeuw, 1436

The small Portrait of a Man with a Blue Chaperon (c. 1430) is thought to be his earliest surviving portrait. It contains many of the elements that were to become characteristic of his portraiture style, including the three-quarters view (a type he revived from antiquity and which soon spread across Europe), directional lighting, elaborate headdress, and, for the single portraits, the framing of the figure within an undefined narrow space set against a flat black background. It is noted for its realism and observation of the small details of the sitter's appearance; the man has a light stubble of one or two days' growth, a reoccurring feature in Van Eyck's early male portraits, where the sitter is, according to Lorne Campbell, "rather inefficiently shaved". Campbell lists other Van Eyck unshaven sitters; Niccolò Albergati (1431), Jodocus Vijdt (1432), Jan van Eyck? (1433), Joris van der Paele (c. 1434–1436), Nicolas Rolin (1435) and Jan de Leeuw (1436).

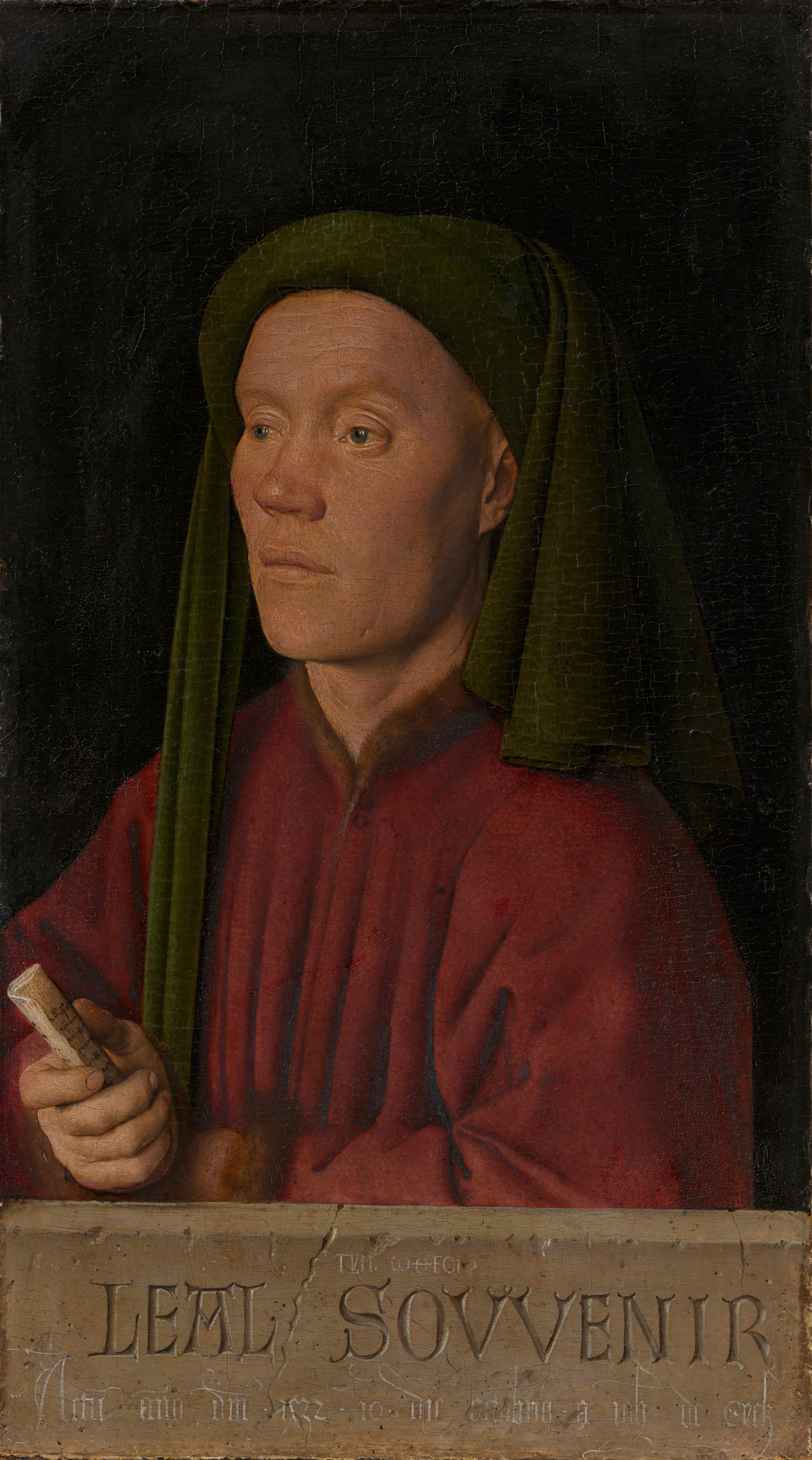
Léal Souvenir, 1432

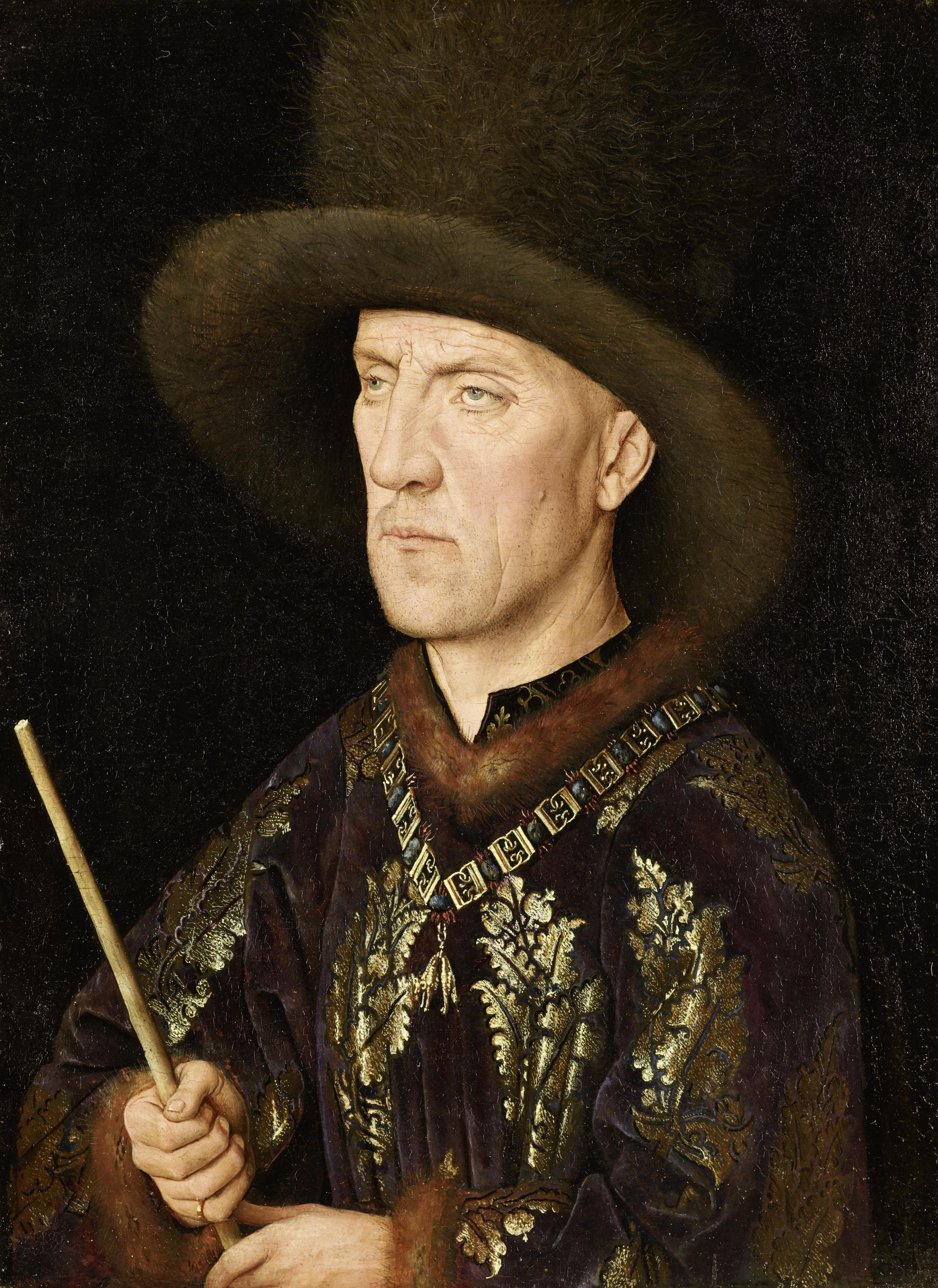
Portrait of Baudouin de Lannoy, 1435

The Léal Souvenir portrait of 1432 continues the adherence to realism and acute observation of the small details of the sitter's appearance. However, by his later works, the sitter is placed at more of a distance, and the attention to detail less marked. The descriptions are less forensic, more of an overview, while the forms are broader and flatter. Even in his early works, his descriptions of the model are not faithful reproductions; parts of the sitter's face or form were altered either to improve the composition or to fit an ideal. He often altered a model's proportions in order to emphasize features of interest. In the portrait of his wife, he altered the angle of her nose, and flattered her with a fashionably high forehead.

The stone parapet at the base of the canvas of Léal Souvenir is painted as if to simulate marked or scarred stone and bears three layers of inscriptions, each rendered in an illusionistic manner, giving the impression they are chiseled onto stone. Van Eyck often set the inscriptions as if in the sitter's voice, so that they "appear to be speaking". Examples include the Portrait of Jan de Leeuw which reads ... Jan de [Leeuw], who first opened his eyes on the Feast of St Ursula [21 October], 1401. Now Jan van Eyck has painted me, you can see when he began it. 1436. In Portrait of Margaret van Eyck of 1439 the lettering acclaims My husband Johannes completed me in the year 1439 on 17 June, at the age of 33. As I can.

Hands play a special significance in Van Eyck's painting. In his early portraits, the sitters are often shown holding objects emblematic of their profession. The small scroll—possibly a legal document—in the right hand of the man in Léal Souvenir suggests that he may have practiced law.

The Arnolfini Portrait of 1432 is filled with symbolism, as is the 1435 Madonna of Chancellor Rolin, commissioned to display Rolin's power, influence and piety.

== Style ==
=== Iconography ===
The small, subtle details often seen in the background of Van Eyck's works belong to a rich iconography embodying what he believed to be the co-existence of the spiritual and the material. This use of symbolism and biblical references is characteristic of his work, a handling of religious iconography he pioneered, with his innovations taken up and developed by Van der Weyden, Memling and Christus.

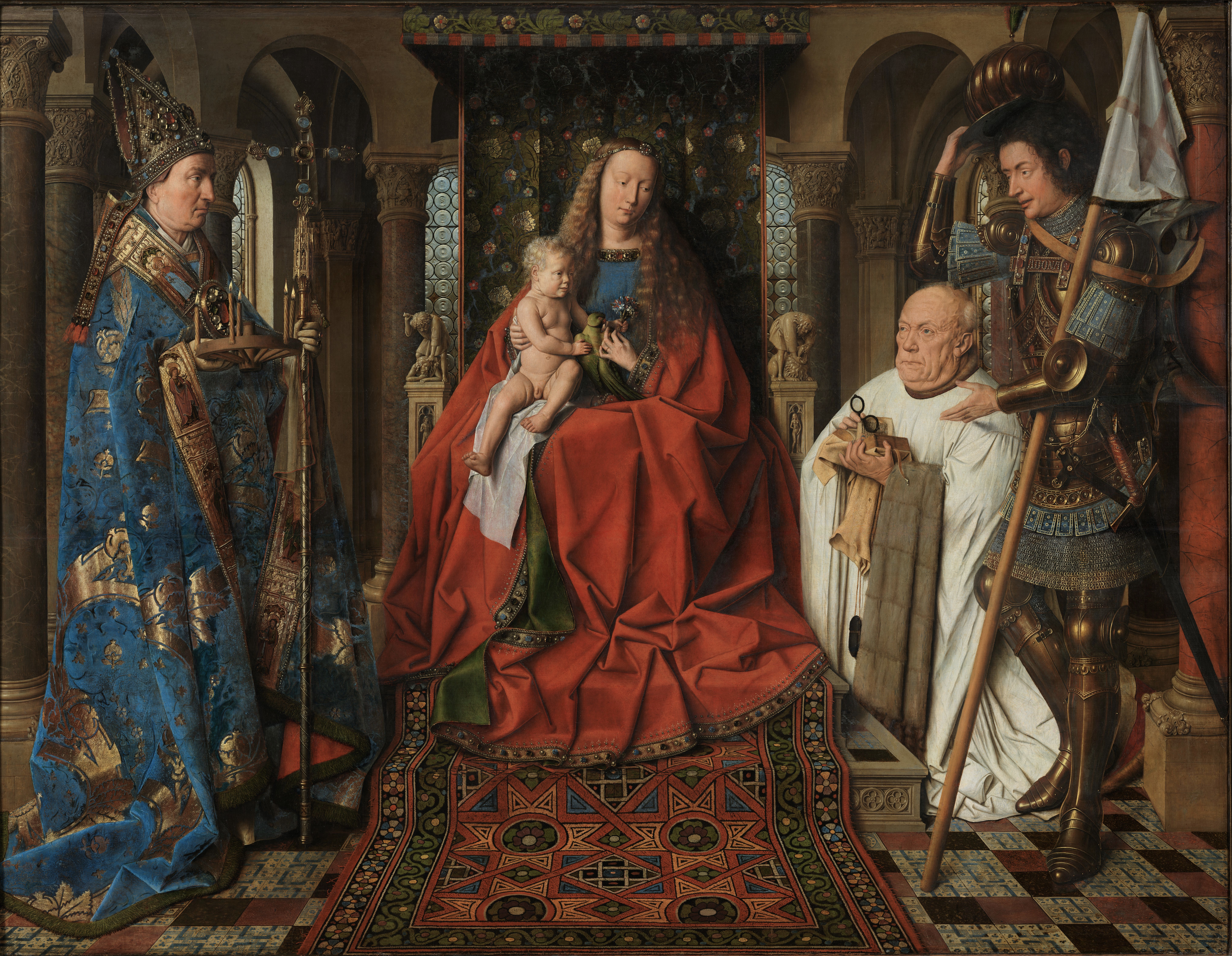
Virgin and Child with Canon van der Paele, c. 1434–1436. Groeningemuseum, Bruges. Van Eyck's Marian paintings are suffused with iconographic detail.

Craig Harbison describes the blending of realism and symbolism as perhaps "the most important aspect of early Flemish art". The placement of such symbols into a scene "was a deliberate strategy to create an experience of spiritual revelation". Van Eyck's religious paintings in particular "always present the spectator with a transfigured view of visible reality". To him the day-to-day is harmoniously steeped in symbolism, such that, according to Harbison, "descriptive data were rearranged [...] so that they illustrated not earthly existence but what he considered supernatural truth." This blend of the earthly and the heavenly points to Van Eyck's belief that the "essential truth of Christian doctrine" can be found in "the marriage of secular and sacred worlds, of reality and symbol". He depicts overly large Madonnas, whose unrealistic size shows the separation between the heavenly from the earthly, but placed them in everyday settings such as churches, domestic chambers or seated with court officials.

Yet the earthly churches are heavily decorated with heavenly symbols. A heavenly throne is clearly represented in some domestic chambers (for example in the Lucca Madonna). More difficult to discern are the settings for paintings such as Madonna of Chancellor Rolin, where the location is a fusion of the earthly and celestial. Van Eyck's iconography is often so densely and intricately layered that a work has to be viewed multiple times before even the most obvious meaning of an element is apparent. The symbols were often subtly woven into the paintings so that they only became apparent after close and repeated viewing, while much of the iconography reflects the idea that, according to John Ward, there is a "promised passage from sin and death to salvation and rebirth".

=== Signature ===
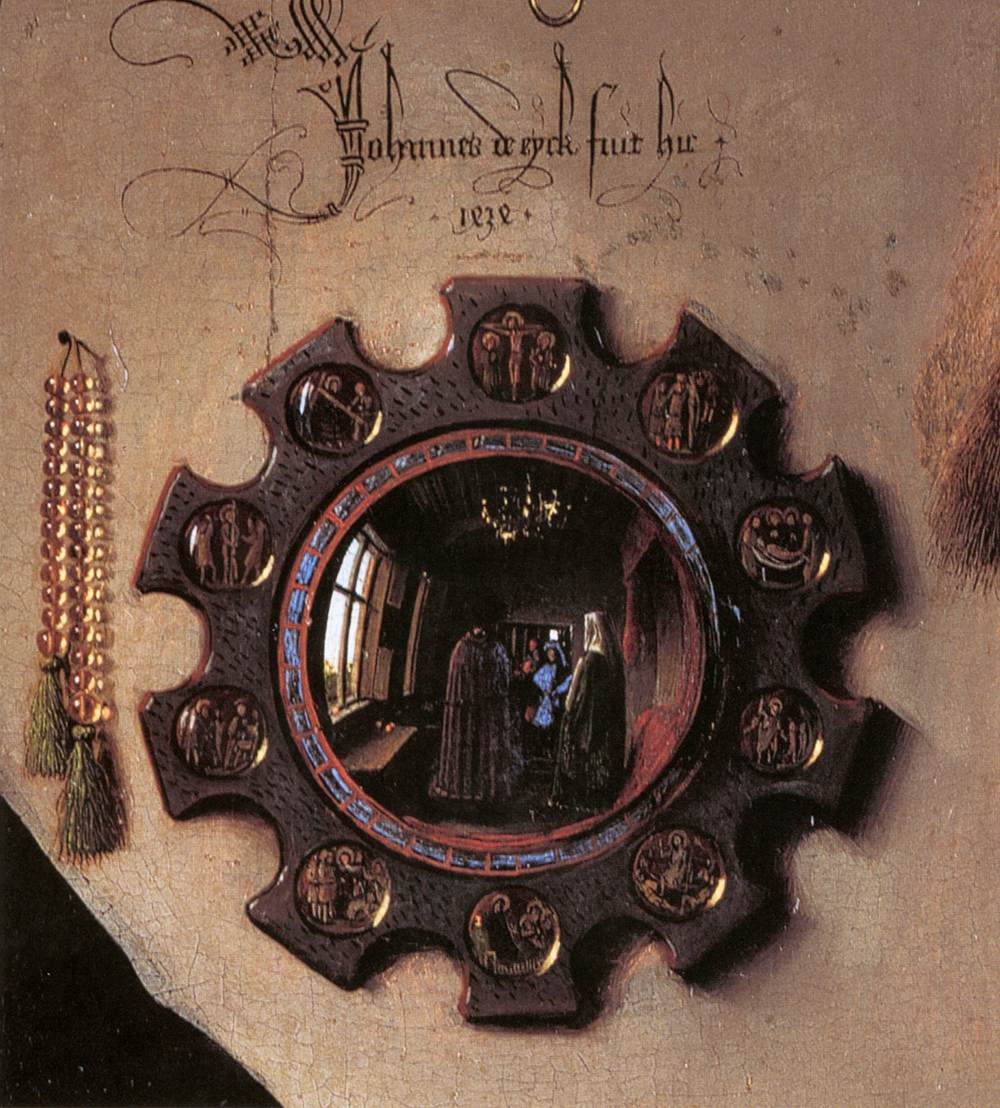
Detail with mirror and signature; Arnolfini Portrait, 1434

Van Eyck was the only 15th-century Netherlandish painter to sign his panels. His motto always contained variants of the words ALS ICH KAN (or a variant) – "As I Can", or "As Best I Can", which forms a pun on his name. The aspirated "ICH" instead of the Brabantian "IK" is derived from his native Limburgish. The signature is sometimes inscribed using Greek lettering such as AAE IXH XAN. The word Kan derives from the Middle Dutch word kunnen related to the Dutch word kunst or to the German Kunst ("art").

The words may be related to a type of formula of modesty sometimes seen in medieval literature, where the writer prefaces his work with an apology for its imperfections, although, given the typical lavishness of the signatures and mottos, it may merely be a playful reference. Indeed, his motto is sometimes recorded in a manner intended to mimic Christ's monogram IHC XPC, for example in his c 1440 Portrait of Christ. Further, as the signature is often a variant of "I, Jan van Eyck was here", it can be seen as a, perhaps somewhat arrogant, assertion of both the faithfulness and trustworthiness of the record and the quality of the work (As I (K)Can).

The habit of signing his work ensured that his reputation survived, and attribution has not been as difficult and uncertain as with other first generation artists of the early Netherlandish school. The signatures are usually completed in a decorative script, often of a kind reserved for legal documents, as can be seen in Léal Souvenir and the Arnolfini Portrait, the latter of which is signed "Johannes de eyck fuit hic 1434" ("Jan van Eyck was here 1434"), a way of recording his presence.

=== Inscriptions ===
Many of Van Eyck's paintings are heavily inscribed, in lettering of Greek, Latin or vernacular Dutch. Campbell sees in many examples a "certain consistency which suggest that he himself had painted them", rather than they are later additions. The letterings seem to serve different functions depending on the type of work on which they appear. In his single panel portraits they give voice to the sitter, most notably in Portrait of Margaret van Eyck, where the Greek lettering on the frame translates as "My husband Johannes completed me in the year 1439 on 17 June, at the age of 33. As I can."

By contrast, the inscriptions on his commissioned religious paintings are written from the point of view of the patron, and written to serve the patron's piousness, charity and dedication to the saint who the sitter is shown accompanying. An inscription on the Virgin and Child with Canon van der Paele, reads "Joris van der Paele, canon of this church, had this work made by painter Jan van Eyck. And he founded two chaplaincies here in the choir of the Lord. 1434. He only completed it in 1436, however."

=== Frames ===
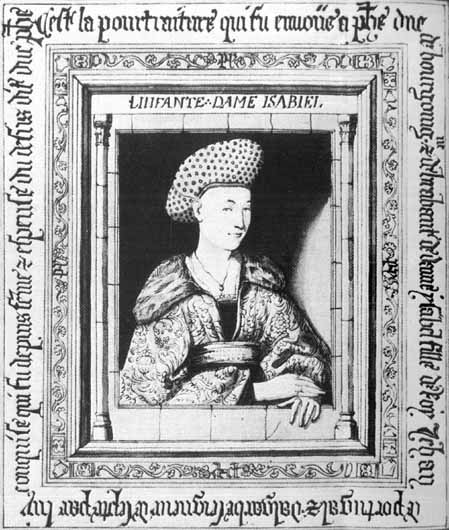
Copy of a Van Eyck, Portrait of Isabella of Portugal (original lost). Private collection

Exceptionally for his time, Van Eyck often signed and dated his frames, then considered an integral part of the work – the two were often painted together, and while the frames were constructed by a body of craftsmen separate to the master's workshop, their work was often considered as equal in skill to that of the painter.

He designed and painted the frames for his single head portraits to look like imitation stone, with the signature or other inscriptions giving the impression that they had been chiseled into the stone. The frames serve other illusionistic purposes; in Portrait of Isabella of Portugal, described by the frame, her eyes gaze coyly but directly out of the painting, as she rests her hands on the edge of a faux stone parapet. With this gesture Isabella extends her presence out of the pictorial space and into that of the viewer.

Many of the original frames are lost and known only through copies or inventory records. The London Portrait of a Man was likely half of a double portrait or pendant; the last record of the original frames contained many inscriptions, but not all were original; the frames were often overpainted by later artists. Portrait of Jan de Leeuw also bears its original frame, which is painted over to look like bronze.

Many of his frames are heavily inscribed, which serves a dual purpose. They are decorative but also function to set the context for the significance of the imagery, similar to the function of margins in medieval manuscripts. Pieces such as the Dresden Triptych were usually commissioned for private devotion, and Van Eyck would have expected the viewer to contemplate text and imagery in unison. The interior panels of the small 1437 Dresden Triptych are outlined with two layers of painted bronze frames, inscribed with mostly Latin lettering. The texts are drawn from a variety of sources, in the central frames from biblical descriptions of the assumption, while the inner wings are lined with fragments of prayers dedicated to saints Michael and Catherine.

== Workshop, unfinished or lost works ==
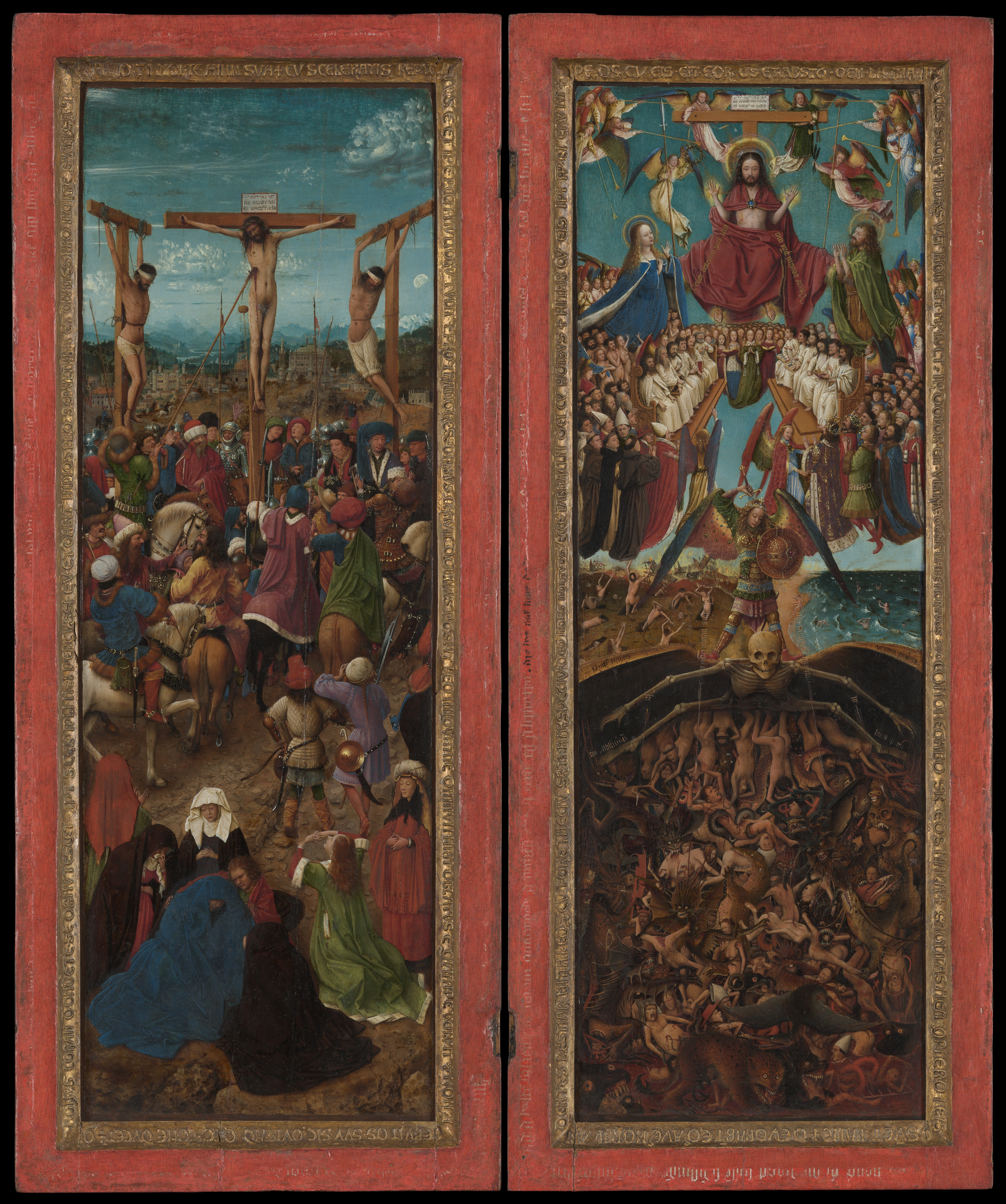
Crucifixion and Last Judgement diptych, c. 1430–1440. Metropolitan Museum of Art, New York

In the years after Van Eyck's death in the summer of 1441, members of his workshop executed works based on his designs. This was not unusual; the widow of a master would often carry on the business after his death. It is thought that either his wife, Margaret, or brother Lambert took over after 1441. Works thus created include the Ince Hall Madonna, Saint Jerome in His Study, a Madonna of Jan Vos (Virgin and Child with St Barbara and Elizabeth) c. 1443, and others. A number of designs were reproduced by second-generation Netherlandish artists of the first rank, including Petrus Christus, who painted a version of the Exeter Madonna.

After his death, members of his workshop also finished paintings that were incomplete. The upper portions of the right hand panel of the Crucifixion and Last Judgement diptych are generally considered the work of a weaker painter with a less distinctive style. It is thought that Van Eyck died leaving the panel unfinished but with completed underdrawings, so the upper area was finished by workshop members or followers.

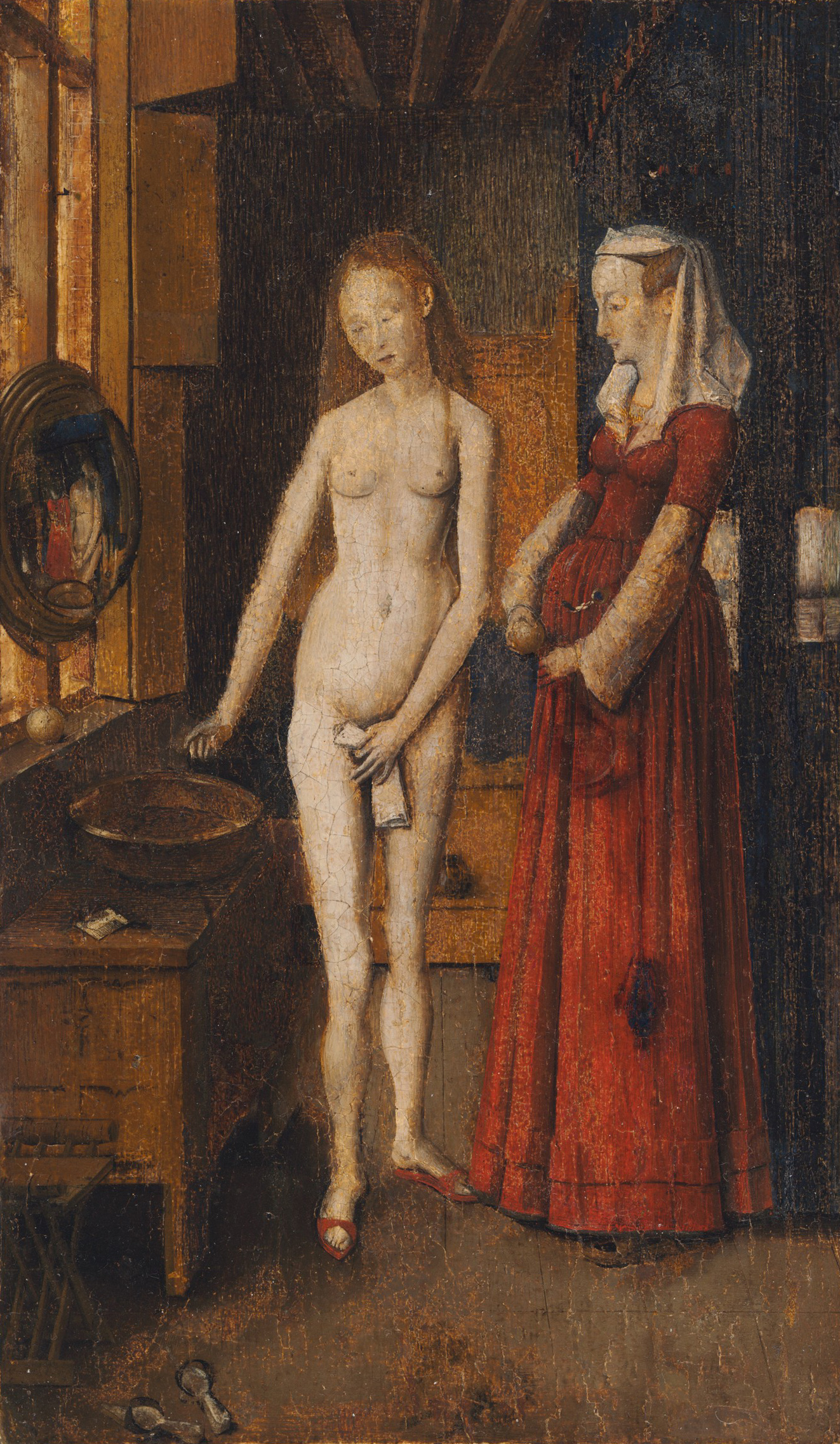
Woman Bathing, copy of a lost Van Eyck, early 16th century by an unknown artist, Netherlandish

There are three works confidently attributed to him but known only from copies. His Portrait of Isabella of Portugal dates to his 1428 visit to Portugal for Philip to draw up a preliminary marriage agreement with the daughter of John I of Portugal. From surviving copies, it can be deduced that there were two other "painted-on" frames apart from the actual oak frame, one of which was lettered with gothic inscription to the top, while a faux stone parapet provided support for her hands to rest upon.

Two extant copies of his Woman Bathing were made in the 60 years after his death, but it is known mostly through its appearance in Willem van Haecht's expansive 1628 painting The Gallery of Cornelis van der Geest, a view of a collector's gallery containing many other identifiable old masters. Woman Bathing bears many similarities to the Arnolfini Portrait, including an interior with a bed and a small dog, a mirror and its reflection, a chest of drawers and clogs on the floor; more broadly similar are the attendant woman's dress, the outline of her figure, and the angle from which she faces.

== Reputation and legacy ==
In the earliest significant source on Van Eyck, a 1454 biography in Genoese humanist Bartolomeo Facio's De viris illustribus, Jan van Eyck is named "the leading painter" of his day. Facio places him among the best artists of the early 15th century, along with Rogier van der Weyden, Gentile da Fabriano, and Pisanello. It is particularly interesting that Facio shows as much enthusiasm for Netherlandish painters as he does for Italian painters. This text sheds light on aspects of Jan van Eyck's production now lost, citing a bathing scene owned by a prominent Italian, but mistakenly attributing to Van Eyck a world map painted by another.

Jan van Eyckplein in Bruges is named for him.
