= Francesco Griffolini =

Italian Renaissance humanist

Start of Griffolini's translation of Phalaris in a contemporary Florentine manuscript

Francesco Griffolini (1420 – 1468×1491), known in Latin as Franciscus Aretinus, was an Italian Renaissance humanist known for his Latin translations of ancient Greek works, especially the Epistles of Phalaris, the Odyssey, some of the Cynic epistles and a number of sermons of John Chrysostom. He was born in Arezzo, exiled to Ferrara and spent his most productive years in Rome and his last years in Naples. His works were dedicated to individuals from throughout Europe.

== Life ==
Griffolini was a native of Arezzo. His father, Mariotto Griffolini, was a merchant executed in 1431 for his part in a conspiracy to overthrow Florentine rule. With his mother, Bartolomea, and his siblings, he lived in exile in Ferrara. There he studied at the University of Ferrara under Guarino Veronese and Theodore Gaza. His Ciceronian style he got from Veronese. In 1447–1448, with his mother and sister, he moved to Rome, where he attended Lorenzo Valla's lectures on rhetoric. He also studied in Greece.

Griffolini has an entry in Bartolomeo Facio's De viris illustribus, which is critical for distinguishing him from contemporaries known as Franciscus Aretinus. There is still much uncertainty about his life. He may be the Franciscus Aretinus, a member of the household of Cardinal Isidore of Kiev who was captured at the fall of Constantinople but subsequently escaped to Candia, from where he wrote a letter to Cardinal Domenico Capranica on 15 July 1453.

Griffolini was in Rome throughout the pontificates of Nicholas V (1447–1455), Callistus III (1455–1458) and Pius II (1458–1464). In 1455–1457, records show him borrowing the works of Thucydides, Heliodorus, Demosthenes and Origen from the Vatican Library. In Rome, he made the acquaintance of Carlo de' Medici. In 1459, he attended the Council of Mantua with Pius II and visited Florence, where he was received by the Medici. Some in the city had not forgotten his father's rebellion. In 1461, Benedetto Accolti wrote on behalf of the city to Pius II requesting that the benefice granted to Griffolini at Castiglion Fiorentino be revoked on the grounds that he was still legally in exile. In 1464, Griffolini was named scriptor apostolicus, giving him a stable income with which to support his aging mother and sister.

After Pope Paul II's reform of the Papal Chancery, Griffolini, through the influence of the admiring humanist Panormita, moved to Naples to become the tutor of Alfonso, Duke of Calabria, from 1466 to 1468. He spent the rest of his life in Naples, living, according to Giovanni Pontano, to a very advanced age. Paolo Cortesi, De hominibus doctis (1490–1491), and Attilio Alessi, Historie dell'antichità d'Arezzo (1552), both record that he died after falling from his horse. The year of his death is unknown. It is sometimes given as 1483 or 1488.

== Works ==
Griffolini wrote a letter to Giovanni Tortelli, dated 22 March 1441.

In 1455–1457, Griffolini translated over 100 sermons by John Chrysostom. Many of these were dedicated to Callistus III, to Cosme de Montserrat and to an archdeacon named Valentino. In 1459, he completed a translation of 88 of Chrysostom's sermons on the Gospel of John for Cardinal Jean Jouffroy. In 1462, he sent a revised translation of the text to Cosimo I de' Medici with a new dedication. In his dedication to Cosimo, Griffolini argued for the equality, and possibly even superiority, of the moderns with the ancients. A critical edition of Griffolini's 1462 translation is available online in open access with the Chrysostomus Latinus in Iohannem Online (CLIO) Project, edited by Chris L. Nighman.

Detail of a decorated initial from a copy of Griffolini's translation of Phalaris

In a letter of 1456, Theodore Gaza reveals that Griffolini had translated from Homeric verses into Latin. A Latin verse translation of book 14 of the Iliad, found in a manuscript copied by Agnolo Manetti, is attributed to him. His magnum opus, however, is his translation of the Epistles of Phalaris before 1457. It originally dedicated it to Malatesta Novello and contained 138 letters attributed to Phalaris. It was printed at Rome in 1468–1469 and 1470–1471 by Ulrich Han, edited by Giovanni Antonio Campano, ensuring it a wide circulation. Griffolini subsequently translated four other letters attributed to Phalaris and dedicated them to King Alfonso I of Naples. Bartolomeo della Fonte produced a vernacular translation of Griffolini's Latin text.

After the death of Valla in 1457, Griffolini completed the last eight books of his teacher's translation of the Iliad that had been left unfinished. To Pius II he dedicated his translation of the letters of Pseudo-Diogenes, a complete translation of Homer's Odyssey (imitating the style of Valla's Iliad) and a prose paraphrase of Pietro da Eboli's Libellus de mirabilibus civitatis Putheolorum. The latter was printed at Naples in 1475. There is a published critical edition of his translation of the Odyssey. The translation was done by 1462 at the latest, since it was completed a year after that of the Iliad, which was already circulating in France by 1461. Unlike Valla, Griffolini did not use the earlier Latin translation of Leontius Pilatus, which he criticizes for its literalness in his preface. His translation is paraphrastic.

In 1459, Griffolini was commissioned to provide the inscription for the tomb of Carlo Marsuppini in Florence. Carlo's relative, Michele, had exposed the conspiracy of 1431 to the Florentine authorities. In 1461, Griffolini translated Lucian's De calumnia and Libanius' Declamationes, dedicating them to John Tiptoft, Earl of Worcester. At Napes, he translated Philostratus' Heroicus for the young Alfonso.

Besides his work as a translator, several manuscripts copied by Griffolini survive.
