= Portrait of Jan de Leeuw =

1436 painting by Jan van Eyck

- Portrait of the Goldsmith Jan de Leeuw
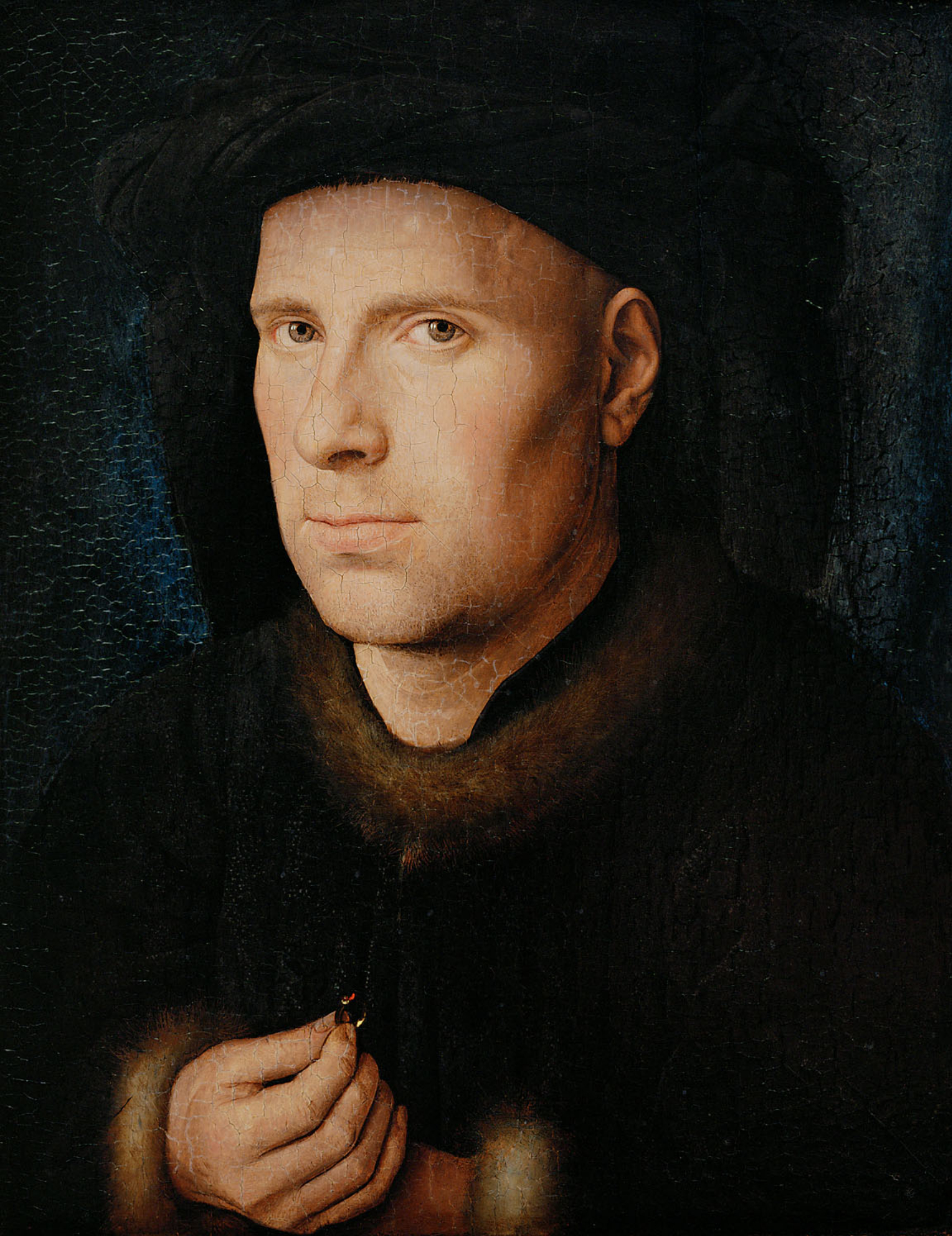
- Artist: Jan van Eyck
- Year: 1436
- Movement: Early Netherlandish painting
- Dimensions: 24.5 cm (9.6 in) × 19 cm (7.5 in)
- Location: Kunsthistorisches Museum, Vienna

Portrait of Jan de Leeuw is a small 1436 oil on wood painting by the Early Netherlandish master Jan van Eyck, now in the Kunsthistorisches Museum, Vienna. De Leeuw was a goldsmith living in Bruges; most art historians accept that, given the familiarity of the portrait, that he and van Eyck knew each other and were on good terms. The work is still in its original frame, which is painted over to look like bronze.

== Description ==
Like the London self-portrait, the painting is dominated by black and dark brown hues, with red overtones. De Leeuw is presented as a serious young man with a rather intense gaze. He is wearing a black chaperon and black fur lined jacket. He turns to look at the viewer while holding a gold ring band with a red jewel, a symbol of his profession, although some have suggested that it might indicate a recent marriage engagement, or even, given his direct gaze, that the painted is meant for his intended.

Formally and tonally, it closely resembles van Eyck's supposed self-portrait in the National Gallery, London. In both works, the head is oversized in relation to the torso. The Vienna panel is still in its original frame, which closely resembles that of the London panel, the central panel of the Dresden Triptych, and a number of works by his workshop; likely they were all put together by the same craftsman. The frame is painted over to look like bronze.

== Frame and inscriptions ==
Portrait of a Man, 1433. Note the similarity of the eyes, turn of head and mouth.

The panel's borders contains a fictive frame, which is heavily inscribed on all sides. The letters are painted in black, and are in the Flemish vernacular. The numerals are rendered in Arabic script. The lettering addresses the viewer directly, and reads, IAN DE {LEEUW} OP SANT ORSELEN DACH / DAT CLAER EERST MET OGHEN SACH, 1401 / GHECONTERFEIT NV HEEFT MI IAN / VAN EYCK WEL BLIICT WANNEERT BEGA(N) 1436 (Jan De [Leeuw], who First Opened His Eyes on the Feast of St Ursula [21 October], 1401. Now Jan Van Eyck Has Painted Me, You Can See When He Began it. 1436). The word "Leeuw" is substituted for a pictogram of a golden lion, a play on the sitter's surname—"Leeuw" means lion in Dutch. Parts of the lettering are carved into the fictive frame's border, other pieces are raised from it in relief.

The inscription seems to contain three chronograms, "a type of sophisticated word puzzle popular among humanists of the fifteenth and sixteenth centuries", where the years in the text are represented when the values of the Roman numerals are summed. According to Bauman they can be found in the year of completion, the year of the sitter's birth and his age, although both Max Friedländer and Erwin Panofsky only accepted the first two.

Addressing the frank and direct aspect of the inscription, art historian Till-Holger Borchert remarked that the picture "appears to be speaking: the portrait address the viewer in the first person singular. The dialogue with the viewer initiated by the challenging gaze of the sitter is continued in the "spoken" address on the frame". This sentiment is echoed by Guy Bauman of the Metropolitan Museum of Art who wrote in 1986 that, "Van Eyck seems, in a God-like way, not only to have endowed the sitter with sight and to have affected his rebirth, but also, recalling Fazio's remark, to have given the portrait a voice".

== See also ==
- List of works by Jan van Eyck
