= Epistles of Phalaris =

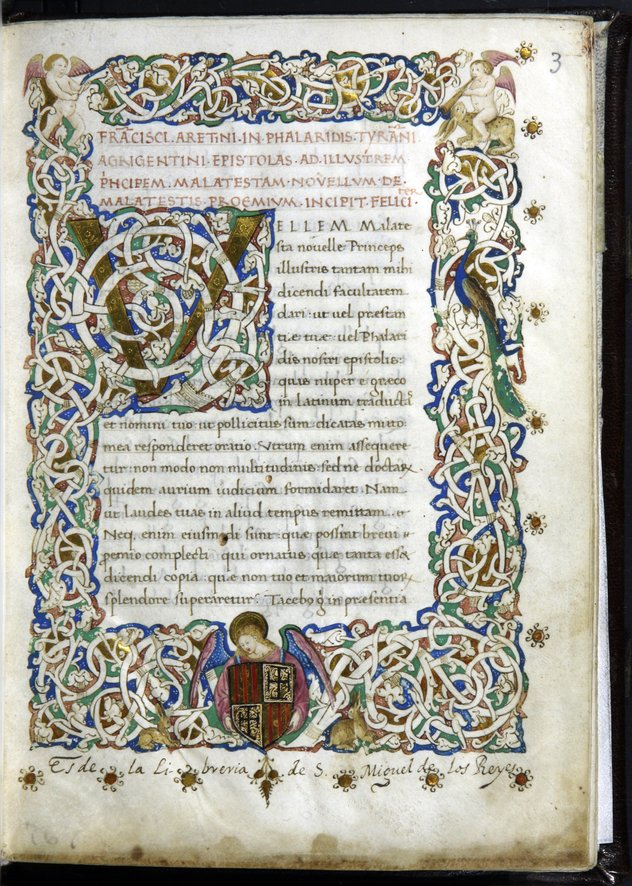
First page of a 15th-century copy of Griffolini's Latin translation of the Epistles, decorated by the Master of Isabella di Chiaromonte

The Epistles of Phalaris or Letters of Phalaris is a collection of 148 ancient Greek letters, all but one attributed to Phalaris, the Greek tyrant of Akragas in the 6th century BC. One is attributed to Abaris and addressed to Phalaris. The letters are pseudepigrapha or forgeries (Note: Busuttil (1967) writes: "probably, these Letters were written to serve as models for students of rhetoric, or as an intellectual pastime: the author showed how cleverly he could take on Phalaris's side. It was never his idea to deceive nor was it his fault if others were taken in completely. . . The author of these letters could have had materials now lost. While a spurious document is of no value for the points it seeks to establish, it may be of value for incidental points. Therefore also these Letters could accidently [sic] preserve some scrap of truth." Cf. suasoria.) composed sometime between the 4th century BC and the 4th century AD. They portray Phalaris as a friend of poets and philosophers rather than a cruel tyrant.

The unknown author or authors may be known as Pseudo-Phalaris.

== Date and authorship ==
The date and circumstances of composition of the letters are disputed. They may be the work of a single author, but most scholars consider them the product of many, "the collection ... having been formed progressively by the addition of letters from different origins and authors".

It has been argued that the first letters were written in Sicily in the 4th century BC, with the collection being finalized in the Roman Empire. Another theory puts their composition around AD 190, being influenced by the satirical treatises of Lucian purporting to rehabilitate Phalaris's reputation. Another, detecting Byzantine clausulae in the Epistles, dates the collection to the 4th century AD.

== Transmission history ==
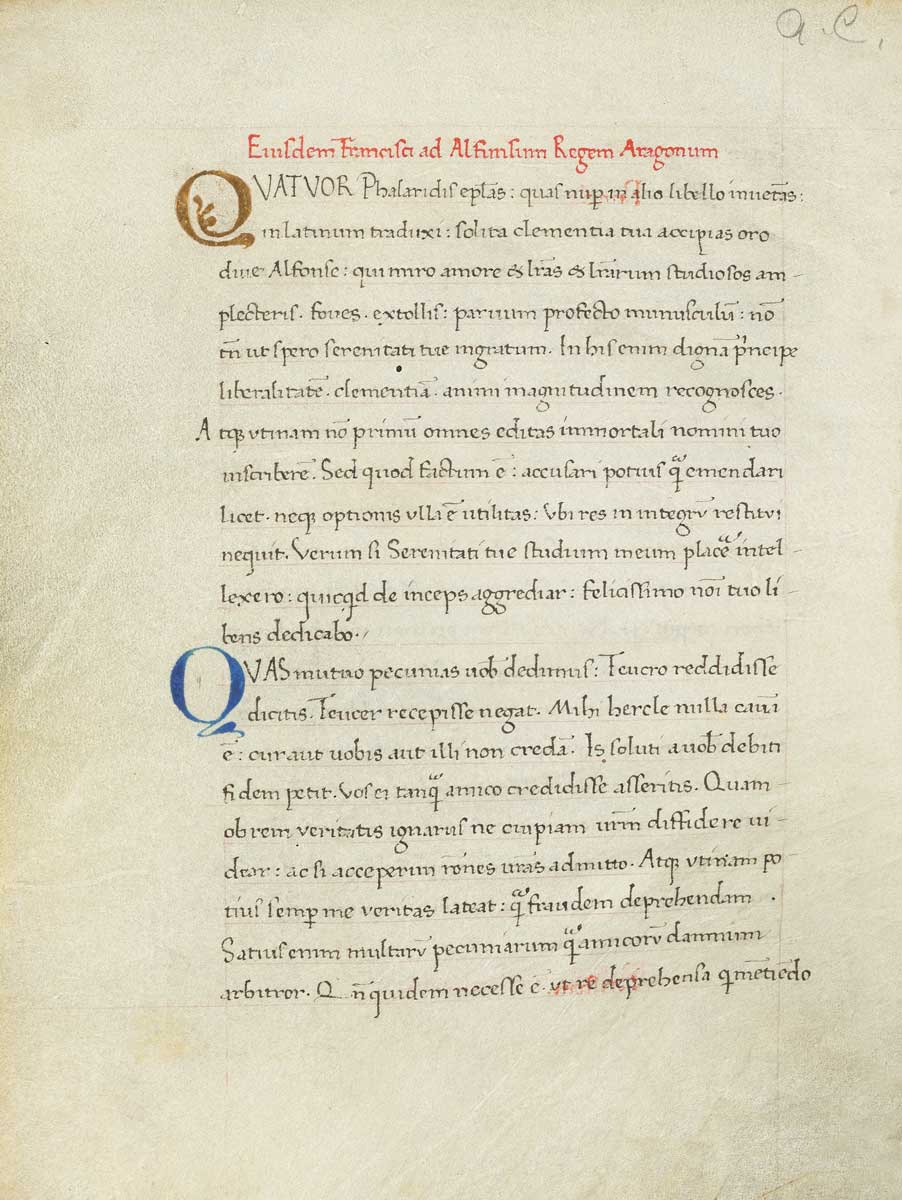
A copy of Griffolini's translation from the Bibliotheca Fictiva Collection

There are 132 manuscripts of the Epistles, although the number of letters found in any given manuscript varies from one to 139. The order of letters also varies. The earliest manuscript is from the 10th century, the latest from the 18th. The earliest writer to quote the letters, however, is Stobaeus in the late 5th or early 6th century. They are mentioned by Photius in the 9th century and by the Suidas in the 10th. They are quoted extensively by John Tzetzes in the 12th century.

A copy of the Epistles was brought to Italy in 1427 by Francesco Filelfo. The first to suspect their authenticity was Poliziano, who thought they were a work of Lucian. A first translation into Latin was made before 1449 by Francesco Griffolini. This was printed at Rome in 1468 or 1469. The editio princeps (first printed edition) of the Greek text was published in Venice in June 1498. It contained only 139 letters. A full edition appeared from the Aldine Press in April 1499. The letters take up 38 and a half leaves in that edition. Neither the number nor the order in the Aldine edition matches any known manuscript. It is a composite based on many manuscripts. Its editor was Marcus Musurus. The numbering of the letters used by scholars today is based on the order created by Musurus.

In the 17th century, Gilles Ménage again raised doubts about their authenticity. An English translation by Charles Boyle, 4th Earl of Orrery, was published in 1695. The work was praised by William Temple. In 1699, Richard Bentley published an influential Dissertation on the Epistles of Phalaris demonstrating that the epistles were misattributed and had actually been written around the 2nd century AD. This caused a controversy over the methods of textual criticism. Boyle wrote a defence of the letters' authenticity in 1698 and Bentley responded in 1699. Jonathan Swift's The Battle of the Books derives some of its inspiration from this controversy.

== List of epistles ==
The list is derived from the most recent Greek edition with Latin translation by Rudolf Hercher. It is not a critical edition.

At least one of the letters (27) was not originally composed as a letter of Phalaris. It is in fact a letter of Libanius that found its way into the collection. The short letter to Hiero (86) that claims "the elephant pays no attention to the mosquito" was also probably never intended to be read as a letter of Phalaris.

1. To Lycinus
2. To the Megaraeans
3. To Tyrsenus
4. To Lycinus
5. To the Leontines
6. To Zeuxippus
7. To Euenus (Note: His son had committed some offence against Akragas's naval captains (Marquis 2014).)
8. To Sameas
9. To Cleostratus
10. To Lacritus (Note: This was one of Phalaris' friends and generals (Marquis 2014).)
11. To Megacles
12. To Aglaus
13. To Herodicus
14. To Eumelus
15. To Teucrus (Note: This was Phalaris' steward (Marquis 2014).)
16. To Aristophon
17. To Amphinomus
18. To Erythia (Note: This was Phalaris' wife (Marquis 2014).)
19. To Paurolas (Note: This was Phalaris' son (Marquis 2014).)
20. To Paurolas
21. To the Messinans
22. To Androcles
23. To Pythagoras
24. To Thorax
25. To Leon (Note: This was son-in-law of Phalaris' friend Philodemus (Marquis 2014).)
26. To Aristophon
27. To Antimachus
28. To Aristomenes
29. To Xenopithes
30. To the Catanians
31. To Stesichorus's daughters
32. To Critodemus
33. To Ctesippus
34. To Pollux
35. To Polygnotus
36. To Cleomenides
37. To Gorgias
38. To Demoteles
39. To Polystratus
40. To Paurolas
41. To Hippolytion
42. To Hippolytion
43. To Teucrus
44. To Nicias
45. To Adimantus
46. To the Aegestaeans
47. To Antisthenes and Theotimus
48. To Menemachus
49. To Epistratus
50. To Onetor
51. To Eteonicus
52. To the Megaraeans
53. To the Leontines
54. To the Himeraeans
55. To Timosthenes
56. To Abaris
57. Abaris to that tyrant Phalaris
58. To Polystratus and Daescus
59. To Nausicles
60. To Aristolochus
61. To Epicharmus
62. To Timosthenes
63. To Aristolochus
64. To Amphidamas and Thrasybulus
65. To Pelopidas
66. To Teleclides
67. To Paurolas
68. To Paurolas
69. To Erythia
70. To Polyclitus (Note: This was Phalaris' physician (Marquis 2014).)
71. To Polyclitus
72. To Peristhenes
73. To Evandrus
74. To Orsilochus
75. To Leontides
76. To Demaratus
77. To Hegesippus
78. To Stesichorus
79. To Stesichorus
80. To Cleaeneta and Theano (Note: These are the wife and daughter, respectively, of Phalaris' friend Philodemus (Marquis 2014).)
81. To the Ennaeans
82. To Timander
83. To the Melitaeans
84. To the Messinans
85. To Timonax
86. To Hiero
87. To Aristaenetus
88. To the Himeraeans
89. To Neolaidas
90. To Mnesicles
91. To Alcander
92. To Stesichorus
93. To the Himeraeans
94. To Stesichorus
95. To Autonoë
96. To Nicophemus
97. To Lysinus
98. To Epicharmus
99. To Cebron
100. To Euctemon
101. To Cleobulus
102. To Cleodicus
103. To Stesichorus's sons
104. To the Catanians
105. To Nicenaetus
106. To Pollux
107. To the Engyines
108. To the Himeraeans
109. To Stesichorus
110. To Clisthenes
111. To Nicippus
112. To Hieronymus
113. To Lamachus
114. To Nicarchus
115. To Nicaeus
116. To Cleomedon
117. To the Melitaeans
118. To the Camarinaeans
119. To the Astypalaeans
120. To Axiochus
121. To the Himeraeans
122. To the Athenians
123. To Lysicles
124. To Pollux (Note: Marquis (2014) assigns this letter to Polyclitus.)
125. To Lacritus
126. To Lacritus
127. To Epistratus
128. To Aristophon
129. To Timolaus
130. To Phaedimus
131. To Philodemus (Note: This was a friend of Phalaris from Syracuse (Marquis 2014).)
132. To Agesilaus
133. To Polymnestor
134. To Polymnestor
135. To Teucrus
136. To Timander
137. To the Ennaeans
138. To Lysander
139. To Arimachus
140. To Polystratus
141. To Agemortus
142. To Teucrus
143. To Cleaeneta
144. To Nicocles
145. To Stesichorus
146. To Stesichorus
147. To Stesichorus
148. To the Ennaeans

== Editions ==
- Whately, S., ed. The Epistles of Phalaris: Translated into English from the Original Greek. 2nd ed. London, 1706.
  - Different digitization
