= Aristolochus (poet) =

Aristolochus (Ancient Greek: Ἀριστόλοχος) was a tragic poet who is mentioned only in the collection of the Epistles formerly attributed to Phalaris, the tyrant of Akragas, where the tyrant is made to speak of him with indignation for venturing to compete with him in writing tragedies.

However, in the 17th century critic Richard Bentley demonstrated these epistles to be spurious, which has cast doubt that there ever was such a person as this Aristolochus.
