= Portrait of a Man with a Blue Chaperon =

Painting by Jan van Eyck

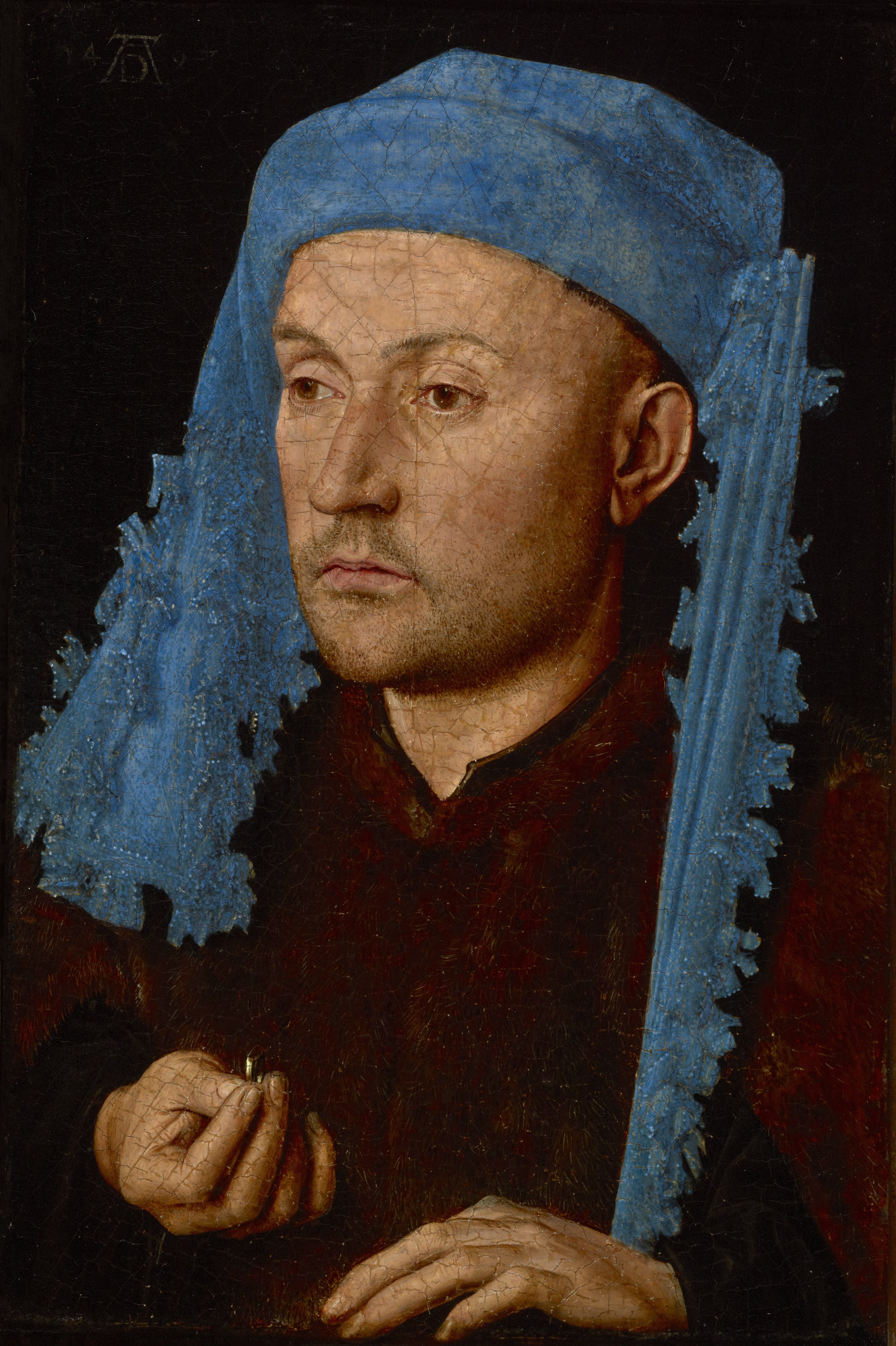
- Artist: Jan van Eyck
- Year: c. 1430
- Type: Oil on panel
- Dimensions: 22.5 cm × 16.6 cm (8.9 in × 6.5 in)
- Location: Brukenthal National Museum, Sibiu

Portrait of a Man with a Blue Chaperon (or Portrait of a Man with a Blue Hood, earlier Portrait of a Jeweller or Man with a Ring) is a very small (22.5 cm x 16.6 cm with frame) oil on panel portrait of an unidentified man attributed to the Early Netherlandish painter Jan van Eyck.

The painting was commissioned and completed sometime around 1430. It contains a number of elements typical of van Eyck's secular portraits, including a slightly oversized head, a dark and flat background, forensic attention to the small details and textures of the man's face, and illusionistic devices. Artists did not give titles to their works during the Northern Renaissance period, and as with any portrait of a sitter whose identity is lost, the painting has attracted generic titles over the years. It had long been thought that the ring held in the man's right hand was meant as an indication of his profession as a jeweller or goldsmith, and so the painting was long titled on variants of such. More recently, the ring is interpreted as an emblem of betrothal and the titles given by various art historians and publications since are usually more descriptive of the colour or form of the headdress.

The painting was attributed to van Eyck in the late 19th century, but this was repeatedly challenged by some art historians until a 1991 cleaning when infrared photography revealed an underdrawing and methods of handling of oil that were unmistakably van Eyck's.

== Description ==
Portrait of a Man (Self Portrait?), 25.5 x 19cm, 1433. National Gallery, London

The man is shown in three-quarters view with his face dramatically lit by light falling from the left. This device provides striking contrasts of light and shadow and draws the viewer's attention on to the man's face. He has brown eyes, and while his expression is impassive, there are traces of melancholy, especially in the downturn of his mouth. He is obviously a member of the nobility, being very well dressed in a fur-lined brown jacket over a black undershirt. His headdress, a chaperon, contains two wings which hang down over the man's shoulders and extend to his chest. The edges of the cloth are given a shredded look at the edges of their trains. The hood is brightly and dramatically coloured using a pigment, ultramarine, extracted from the expensive lapis lazuli gemstone to give it its bright, intense hue. The headdress is of a similar but less extravagant type to that seen in van Eyck's c. 1433 Portrait of a Man, and worn by a figure in the distance in his c. 1435 Madonna of Chancellor Rolin. This type of headdress was to go out of fashion by the mid-1430s, conveniently and definitively dating the painting as having been completed before then.

It is not known if the ring held in his right hand is intended to indicate that the sitter was a jeweller or goldsmith – as had been previously thought until Erwin Panofsky's analysis in the mid century – or that the painting was commissioned as a betrothal portrait to mark a proposal of marriage intended for an unseen bride and her family. This latter theory is supported by the panel's near miniature dimensions; such a small size would have been easily packed and transported to the intended's family.

He has a light beard of one or two days' growth, a common feature in other of van Eyck's male portraits, where the sitter is often either unshaven, or according to Lorne Campbell of the National Gallery, London, "rather inefficiently shaved". Art historian Till-Holger Borchert praises van Eyck's recording of the man's stubble "with painstaking precision; nothing is idealised." Yet it is interesting to consider such an idealised portrait in the context of a betrothal portrait, where the intended bride's family most likely had not met the man and are dependent solely on the portrait for an indication of his means and character. Carol Richardson observes that the unidealised representation would have been a significant novelty and shock at the time, and that, complete with the evident skill of the painter, the verisimilitude would have given the sitter weight and creditability.

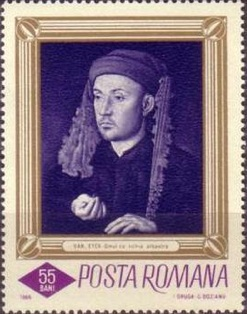
The portrait on a 1966 Romanian postage stamp

The panel contains two illusionistic passages; the ring and his right hand appear to project out of the painting, while the minutely described fingers of his left hand seem to lie on a parapet positioned on what would have been the lower border of the original—but now lost—frame.

== Attribution ==
The painting is not signed or dated by van Eyck. Curiously, the panel bears an imitation of the "AD" signature associated with Albrecht Dürer to the top right, and was for a period dated 1492. These are later additions by an unknown hand for unknown reasons. The work was given its current attribution in the late 19th century and exhibited as such in Bruges in 1902. However, there were disagreements and often heated arguments among art historians in the early and mid-20th century over the authorship. Max J. Friedländer, like Georges Hulin de Loo, was convinced that it was a van Eyck; among other factors he saw a lot of similarity with the signed and dated London Léal Souvenir of c. 1432. Friedländer strongly and at length refuted claims by German art historian Karl Voll that the panel was completed in the 1490s by a follower. Although Voll later came to believe that the work originated in the early 1430s, he remained convinced that it was not from the hand of van Eyck. His view was shared some 30 years later by Panofsky, who saw weakness in the portrait he believed irreconcilable with as a skilled and accomplished painter.

Attribution to van Eyck is now broadly accepted since an infrared photography examination carried out during a 1991 restoration revealed an underdrawing and paint handling very similar to that found in confirmed, signed works by the artist.

=== Provenance ===
The painting came into the collection of Samuel von Brukenthal (1721-1803), Habsburg governor of Transylvania from 1774 to 1787. Along with the rest of his collection at his Baroque house, Brukenthal Palace in Hermannstadt (Sibiu), it became part of a public collection that opened in 1817. Until 1948, the panel belonged to the Brukenthal National Museum in Sibiu, Romania. That year, the new Communist regime seized the panel, along with eighteen others it considered the museum's most valuable holdings, and gave it to the National Museum of Art of Romania in Bucharest. At the end of 2006, in time for Sibiu's stint as European Capital of Culture, the works were returned to the Brukenthal Museum.

== See also ==
- List of works by Jan van Eyck

== Sources ==
- Borchert, Till-Holger. Van Eyck. London: Taschen, 2008. ISBN 3-8228-5687-8
- Campbell, Lorne. The Fifteenth-Century Netherlandish Paintings. London, National Gallery. New Haven: Yale University Press, 1998. ISBN 0-300-07701-7
- Richardson, Carol. Locating Renaissance Art: Renaissance Art Reconsidered. Yale University Press, 2007. ISBN 0-300-12188-1
- Ridderbos, Bernhard; van Buren, Anne; van Veen, Henk. Early Netherlandish paintings: Rediscovery, Reception and Research. Amsterdam: Amsterdam University Press, 2004. ISBN 90-5356-614-7
