= Aristolochus (Achaean soldier) =

Achaean soldier killed by Aeneas

In Greek mythology, Aristolochus (Ancient Greek: Ἀριστόλοχος means "well-born") was an Achaean soldier who was slain by the hero Aeneas. The latter crushed Aristolochus' head with a great stone which broke both his helmet and skull together.
