= Bartolomeo Facio =

Italian historian, writer and humanist

Bartolomeo Facio (c. before 1410 – 1457), Latinized as Bartholomaus Facius, was an Italian historian, writer and humanist.

Facio was born into a wealthy family of La Spezia, Liguria. He studied in Verona, where he studied with Guarino da Verona, Florence, where he added Greek to his Latin, and Genoa and was a notary in Lucca and Genoa. In 1443 he moved to Naples at first as the Genoese envoy, then by 1445 at the service of King Alfonso V of Aragon as secretary and official historian. Facius served as tutor to Prince Ferrante, who became Ferdinand I of Naples.

In addition to translations, his works include De viris illustribus (1456), which comprises over ninety brief lives, organized by professions; his introduction to the section of painters ranks him among art historians. He also wrote the court history De rebus gestis ab Alphonso I Neapolitanorum rege libri X (1448-1445), and the moral treatises De humanae vitae felicitate ("Of the felicities of human lives") and De excellentia ac praestantia hominis ("Of the excellences and outstanding character of Man"). His De bello veneto clodiano remained in manuscript until it was published in 1568.

Like many humanists of his era, Facio engaged in skirmishes with his peers, such as Lorenzo Valla with his Invectivae in Laurentium Vallam; Valla similarly wrote his own Antidotum in Facium is an invective against Bartolomeo.

He died at Naples in 1457.
