= Saint Luke Drawing the Virgin =

Painting by Rogier van der Weyden

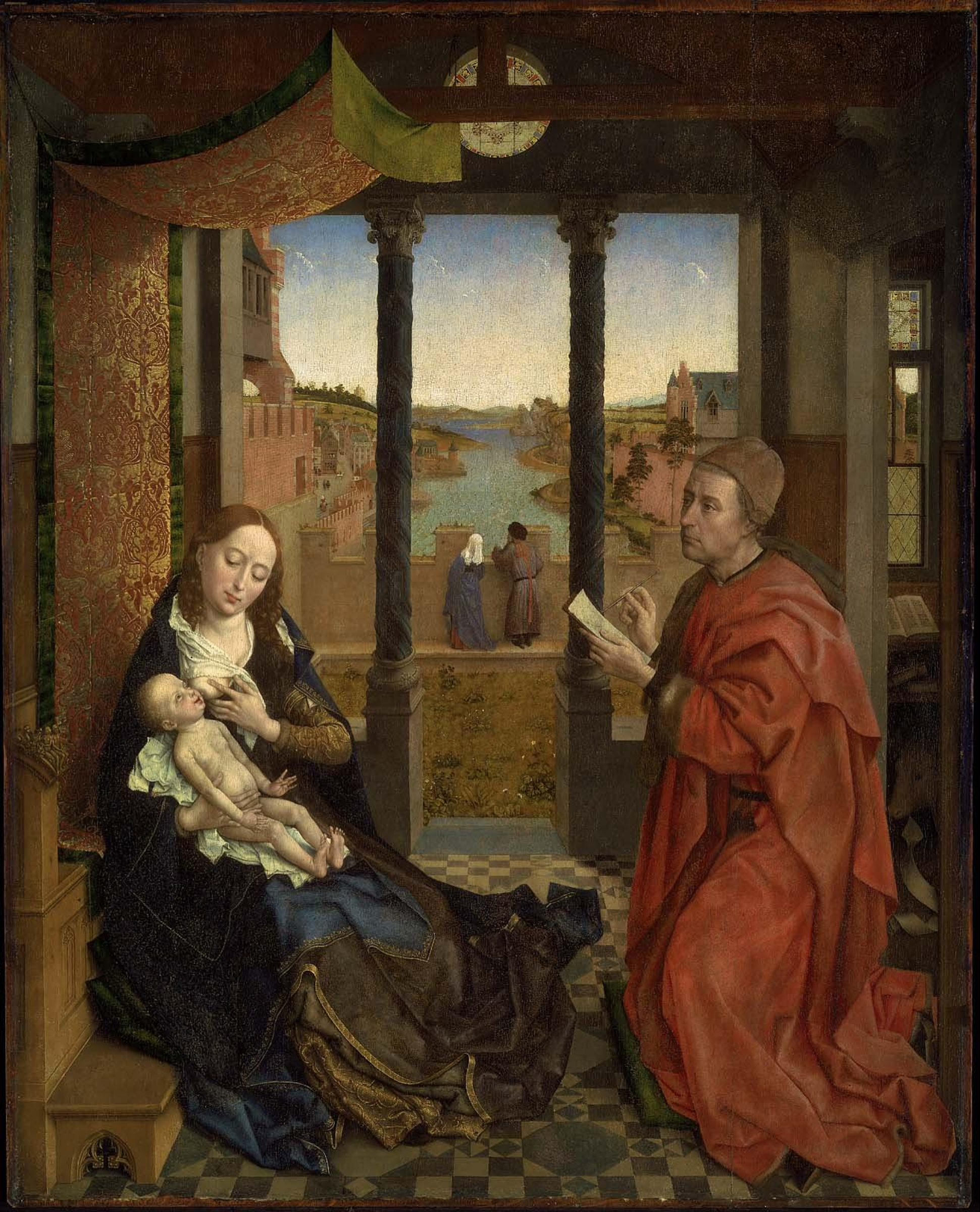
- Artist: Rogier van der Weyden
- Year: c. 1435–1440
- Dimensions: 137.5 cm × 110.8 cm (54 1/8 in × 43 5/8 in)
- Location: Museum of Fine Arts, Boston
- Accession: 93.153

Saint Luke Drawing the Virgin is a large oil and tempera on oak panel painting, usually dated between 1435 and 1440, attributed to the Early Netherlandish painter Rogier van der Weyden. Housed in the Museum of Fine Arts, Boston, it shows Luke the Evangelist, patron saint of artists, sketching the Virgin Mary as she nurses the Child Jesus. The figures are positioned in a bourgeois interior which leads out towards a courtyard, river, town and landscape. The enclosed garden, illusionistic carvings of Adam and Eve on the arms of Mary's throne, and attributes of St Luke are amongst the painting's many iconographic symbols.

Van der Weyden was strongly influenced by Jan van Eyck, and the painting is very similar to the earlier Madonna of Chancellor Rolin, usually dated to around 1434, with significant differences. The figure's positioning and colourisation are reversed, and Luke takes centre stage; his face is accepted as van der Weyden's self-portrait. Three near contemporary versions are in the Hermitage Museum, Saint Petersburg, the Alte Pinakothek, Munich, and the Groeningemuseum, Bruges. The Boston panel is widely considered the original from underdrawings that are both heavily reworked and absent in other versions. It is in relatively poor condition, having suffered considerable damage, which remains despite extensive restoration and cleaning.

The painting's historical significance rests both on the skill behind the design and its merging of earthly and divine realms. By positioning himself in the same space as the Madonna, and showing a painter in the act of portrayal, Van der Weyden brings to the fore the role of artistic creativity in 15th-century society. The panel became widely influential with near copies by the Master of the Legend of Saint Ursula and Hugo van der Goes.

== Commission ==
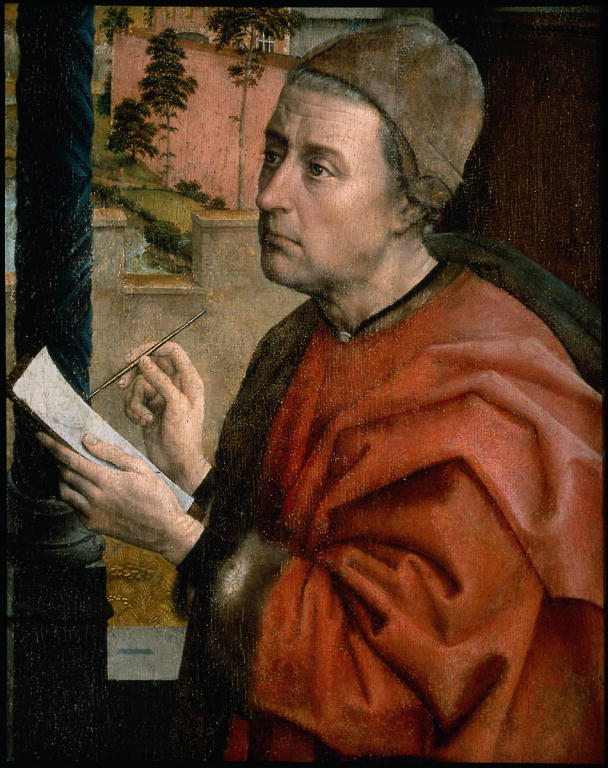
Detail of Saint Luke; probable van der Weyden self-portrait

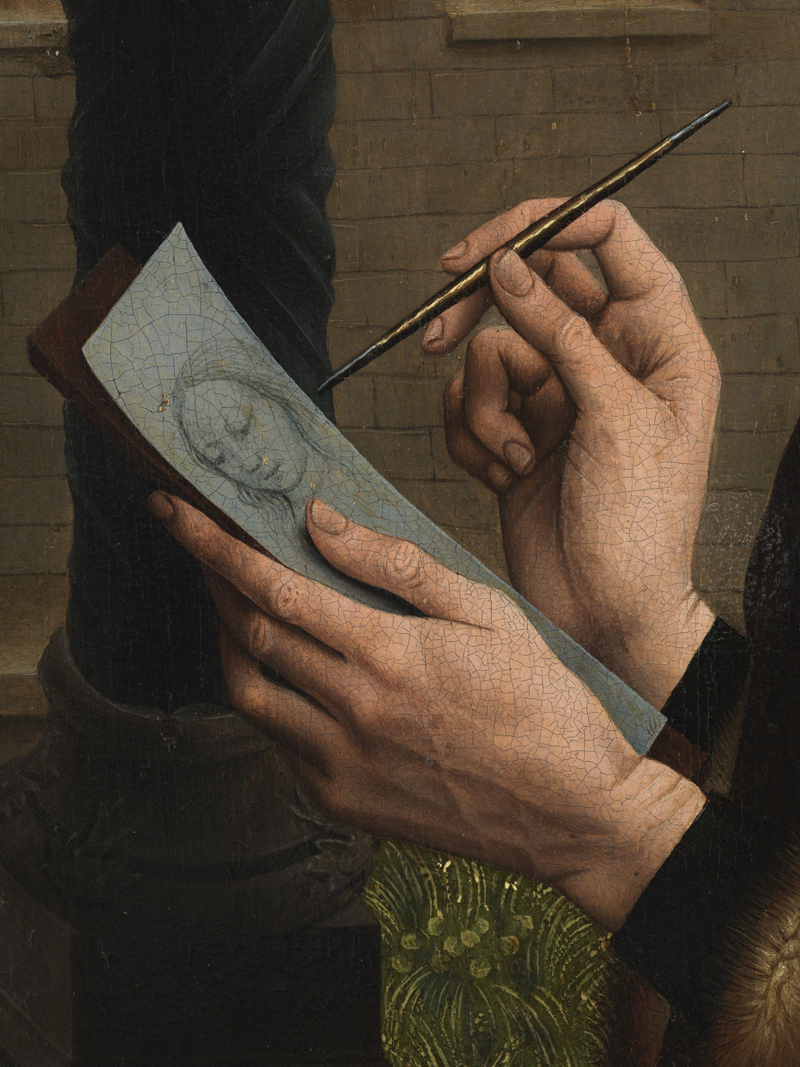
Copy after Rogier van der Weyden, Saint Luke drawing the Virgin (detail), c. 1491–1510. Groeningemuseum, Bruges

There are no surviving contemporary archival documents for Rogier van der Weyden's Saint Luke Drawing the Virgin, but art historians agree that it was almost certainly painted for the Brussels painters' guild, for their chapel at the Church of St. Michael and St. Gudula (now the cathedral), where van der Weyden is buried. It may have been commissioned to celebrate the artist's appointment as city painter for Brussels. Luke the Evangelist was thought to have been a portraitist, and Northern European painters' guilds were considered to be under his protection.

In the 15th-century images of Luke painting the Virgin were more commonly found in Northern rather than Italian art. Luke was credited with painting the original of the immensely popular Italo-Byzantine Cambrai Madonna, to which numerous miracles were attributed. The original of that work was taken to France from Rome in 1440, and within four years at least 15 high quality copies had been made. It was regarded as an example of St Luke's skill, and contemporary painters strove to emulate him in their depictions of Mary. Popular belief held that the essence of the Virgin was captured in Luke's portrait of her.

== After van Eyck ==
Van der Weyden closely follows van Eyck's c. 1435 Madonna of Chancellor Rolin, though there are significant differences. The landscape in the van der Weyden is less detailed, and its top gives less of an illusion of openness than van Eyck's. The most obvious similarity is the two figures standing at a bridge, who may not carry specific identities; those in the van der Weyden are sometimes identified as Joachim and Anne, the Virgin's parents. In van Eyck's painting the right hand figure wears a red turban, a motif widely accepted as that artist's indicator of a self-portrait; similar images can be found on the London Portrait of a Man and the reflection in the knight's shield in the Virgin and Child with Canon van der Paele, Bruges.

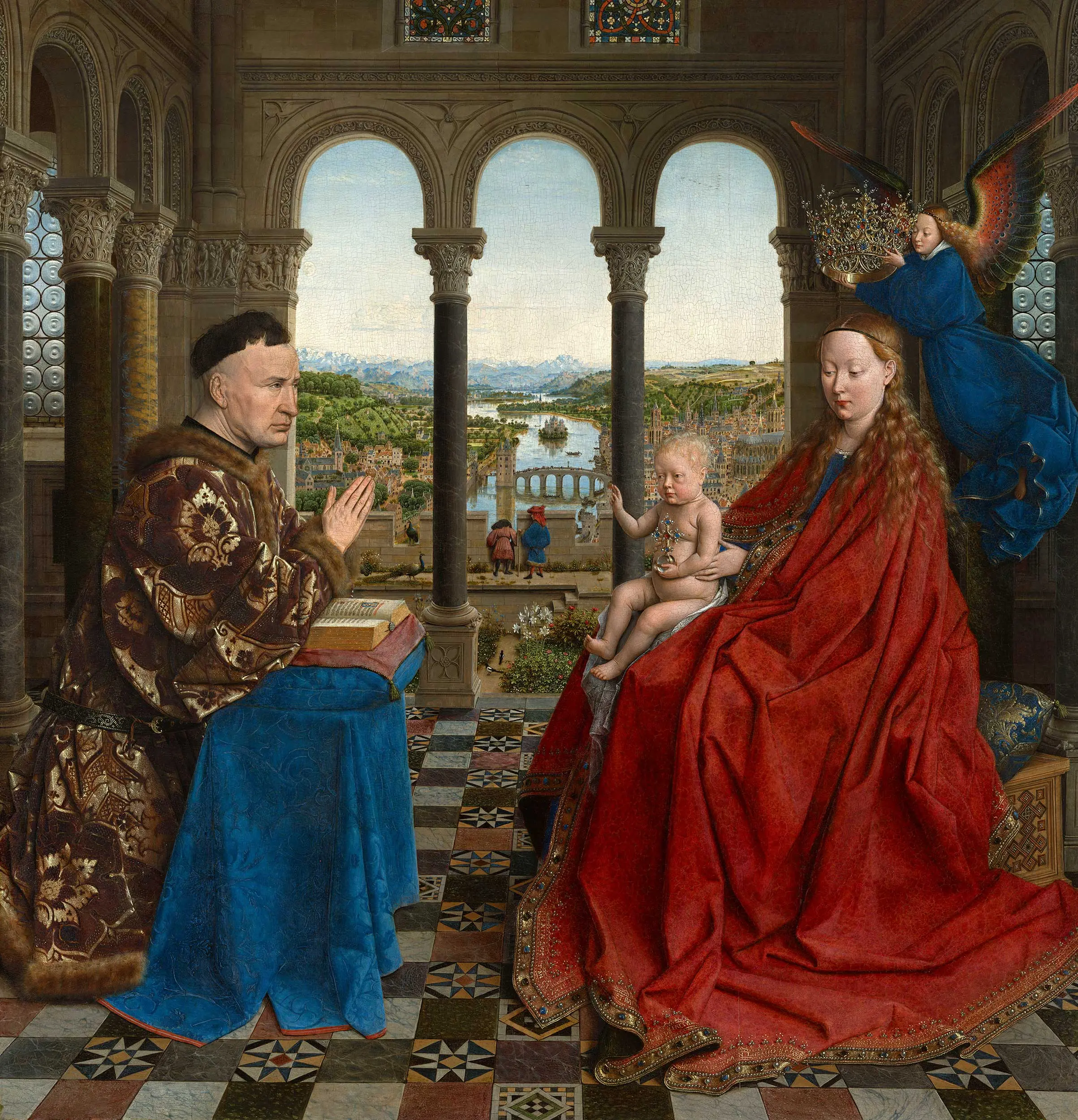
Jan van Eyck, Madonna of Chancellor Rolin, c. 1435. Louvre, Paris

Van der Weyden reverses the positioning of the main figures; the Virgin appears to the left, a positioning that became predominant in later Netherlandish diptychs. The colours in this work are warmer than those in the van Eyck. Van der Weyden switches the colours of their costumes; Luke is dressed in red or scarlet, Mary in the more typical warm blues. The Virgin type has further been changed, here she is depicted as a Maria Lactans ("Nursing Madonna"). This is one of the standard depictions of her, different from the Hodegetria (Our Lady of the Way, or She who points the way) Virgin type most usually associated with Byzantine and Northern 15th-century depictions of St Luke. This depiction of Mary's motherhood stresses the "redemption of mankind by Christ as human ... [and] spiritual nourishing".

== Description ==
The panel contains four individual pieces of oak, painted over a chalk ground bound with glue. The preparation wood is dated to around 1410, giving an estimated date for the Van der Weyden in the mid-1430s. The dominant pigments are lead white (often used in the panel to highlight blue and green passages), charcoal black, ultramarine, lead-tin-yellow, verdigris and red lake. There has been some discolouration – some greens are now brown, including pigments used to depict grass in the background.

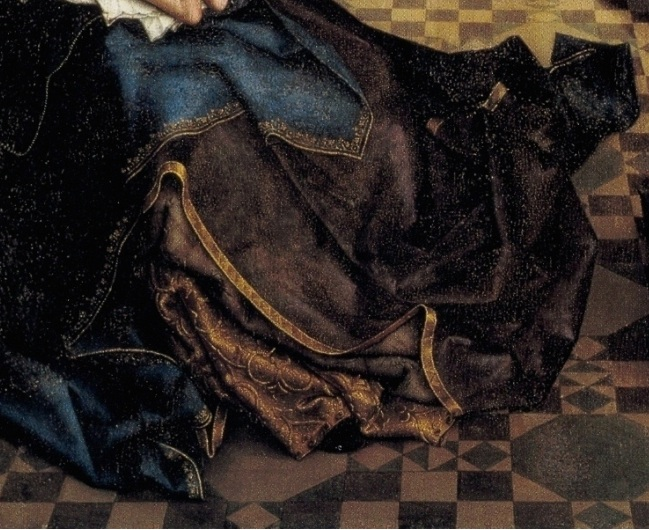
The folds in Mary's dress

Mary sits under a brocade canopy or cloth of honour, painted in brown hues which have since discoloured to dark green. The canopy hangs down to a wooden bench attached to the wall behind her. Mary's hair is loose and she wears an embroidered dress lined with fur. Around her neck is a light veil, and she is shown in the act of nursing. Her dress is a centrepiece of the panel, composed of a variety of blues overlaid with lead white and deep blue lapis lazuli highlights. The inner parts of her robe contain violet coloured fabrics, lined with greyish blues and purples.

Luke is positioned on a green cushion, between the heavenly figure and the small study behind him. He is either rising from a kneeling position or about to genuflect. His eyes fix on her attentively, and he seems near hypnotised. Jesus is similarly transfixed. Hall describes Luke's hands as floating before him, holding the tools "with the same delicacy that an angel might hold a lily or sceptre". Mary has turned her face so that he can depict her in near full profile, a rare honour, while Luke's kneeling position is closely analogous to that of a typical donor portrait in the presence of the Virgin.

Luke is beardless and in his early 40s, close to van der Weyden's age in the mid-1430s. His face is not idealised; he is middle-aged with light stubble and greying hair. The room behind him contains his attributes including an ox and an open book representing his Gospel. He is painted with more naturalism than Mary; his eyes in particular are more realistically drawn. Christ's conform to the then idealised form, as simple crescents. Mary's are formed from curved lines typical of late Gothic ideals of feminine beauty. Compared to contemporary paintings of this type, the work is unusually free of inscriptions; they appear only on items in Luke's study, dimly perceived on his right: on a book, on an ink bottle, and on a scroll emanating from the mouth of his ox, beneath the small desk.

The scene is set within a rather narrow interior space, with a barrel vault ceiling, patterned floor tilings, and stained glass windows. The outer wall opens to the midground, with a patch of grass and plants, and has a view of a river or inlet. Art historian Jeffrey Chipps Smith notes how the transition between the grounds establishes a "complex spatial space in which [van der Weyden] achieved an almost seamless movement from the elaborate architecture of the main room to the garden and parapet of the middle ground to the urban and rural landscape behind".

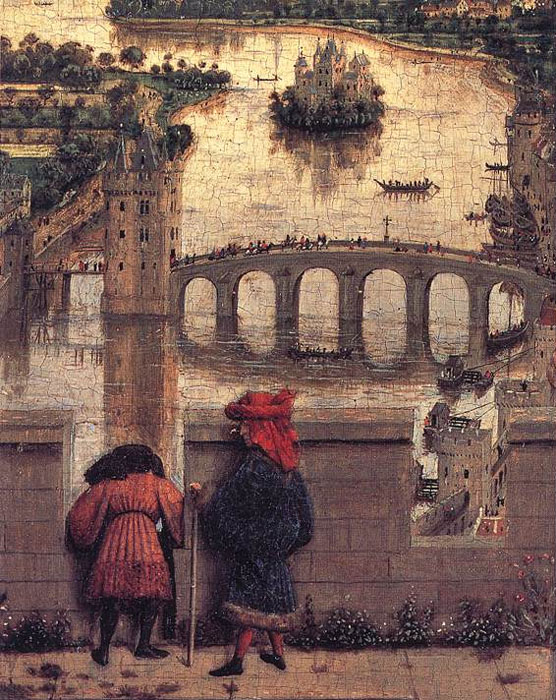
Jan van Eyck, Madonna of Chancellor Rolin (detail)

Two figures in the mid-ground stand at a battlement wall overlooking the water, their backs turned against the viewer, the male pointing outwards. They are framed by columns, and are looking towards the detailed city and landscape in the background. The figures seem preoccupied with "looking", which Carol Purtle believes, to van der Weyden, was a form of devotionalism; through meditating on an image, the "beholder experienced visions of transports of ecstasy". Technical analysis shows that both figures were heavily reworked both in the underdrawing and the final painting; the hood of the figure on the right was originally red, but over-painted as black, amongst many other differences.

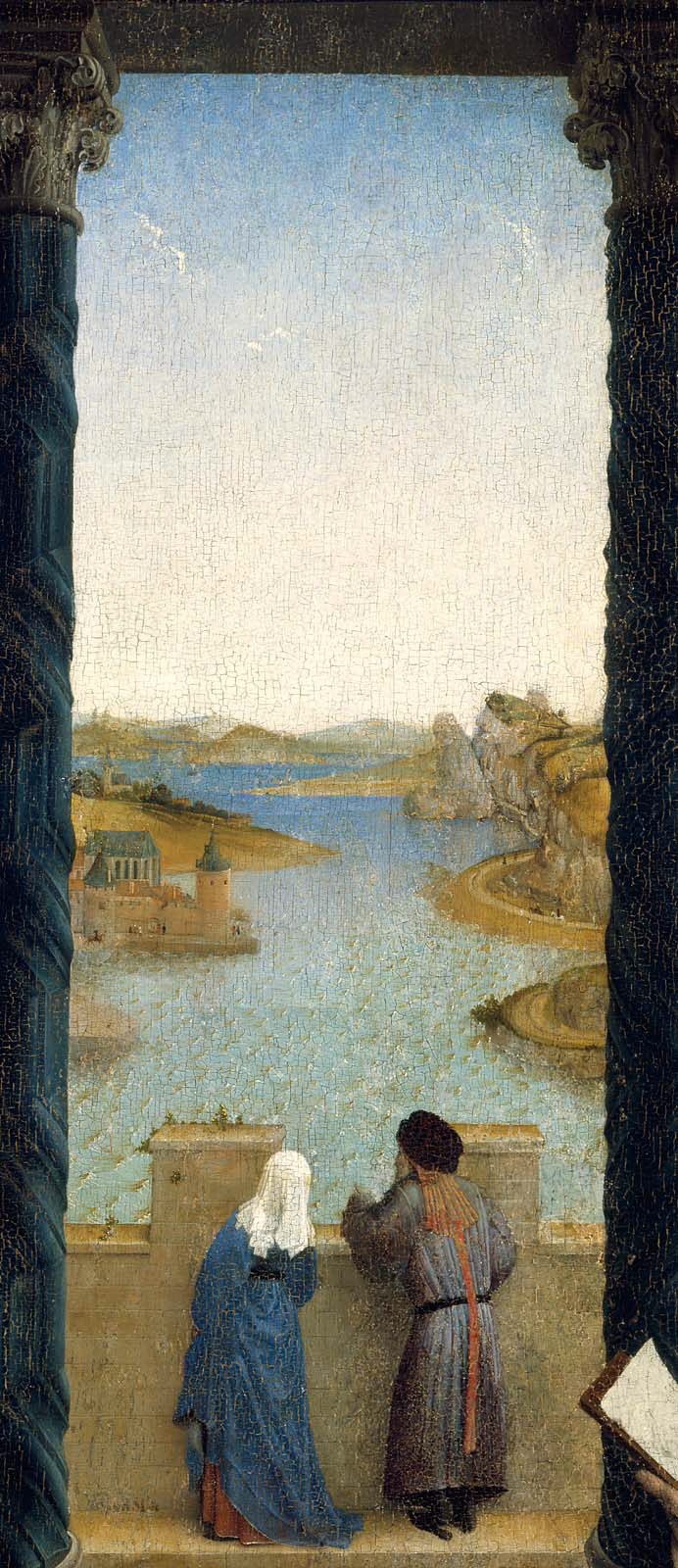
Detail of figures in the midground

The positioning of these figures closely resembles that of two persons depicted in the van Eyck panel. In that painting the right-hand figure turns to face his companion, gesturing at him to look outwards. In the van der Weyden, the equivalent figure seems protective of his friend, who here is female, while the left-hand figure in the earlier panel might represent a tribute to the artist's brother Hubert who had died in the 1420s. A red headdress was an indicator of self-portraiture for van Eyck. As in the van Eyck, the figures act as examples of repoussoir, in that they draw our attention to the picture's underlying theme – the painting's ability to visualize the infinity of the world in the landscape. The painting may allude to the concept of paragone; the man points to the landscape, perhaps highlighting the ability of painting, unlike sculpture, to supply its foreground with background.

Examination of the underdrawing shows that the artist intended a van Eyckian angel crowning the Virgin, but this was omitted from the final painting. He heavily reworked the positions of the three main figures even towards the end of completion. The draperies of the mantles were at first larger. Christ's body at first faced Luke, but was later tilted in the direction of his mother. The mother and child were brought closer together. Luke's head was at first level with the Virgin's, but in the final painting is raised slightly above. The differences extend beyond those in the foreground. The fortifications of the inner courtyard have been enlarged, while the two figures looking out over the river were smaller, the river itself narrower.

== Self-portrait ==
Luke's face is widely considered to be a van der Weyden self-portrait. He may have wanted to associate himself both with a saint and with the founder of painting. This is reinforced by the fact that Luke is shown drawing in silverpoint on white paper; an extremely difficult medium that demands high concentration, and is normally used only for preparation. The artist is boldly emphasising his ability and skill with preparatory sketches; a single surviving silverpoint drawing attributed to van der Weyden, now in the Louvre, contains a female head very similar to Mary's in the Boston panel.

Van der Weyden appears intelligent and handsome, but weather-worn. He inserted a self-portrait into one other work; the lost Justice of Trajan and Herkinbald, known through a tapestry copy in the Historical Museum of Bern. Later northern artists followed his lead, using self-portraits in their own depictions of Luke.

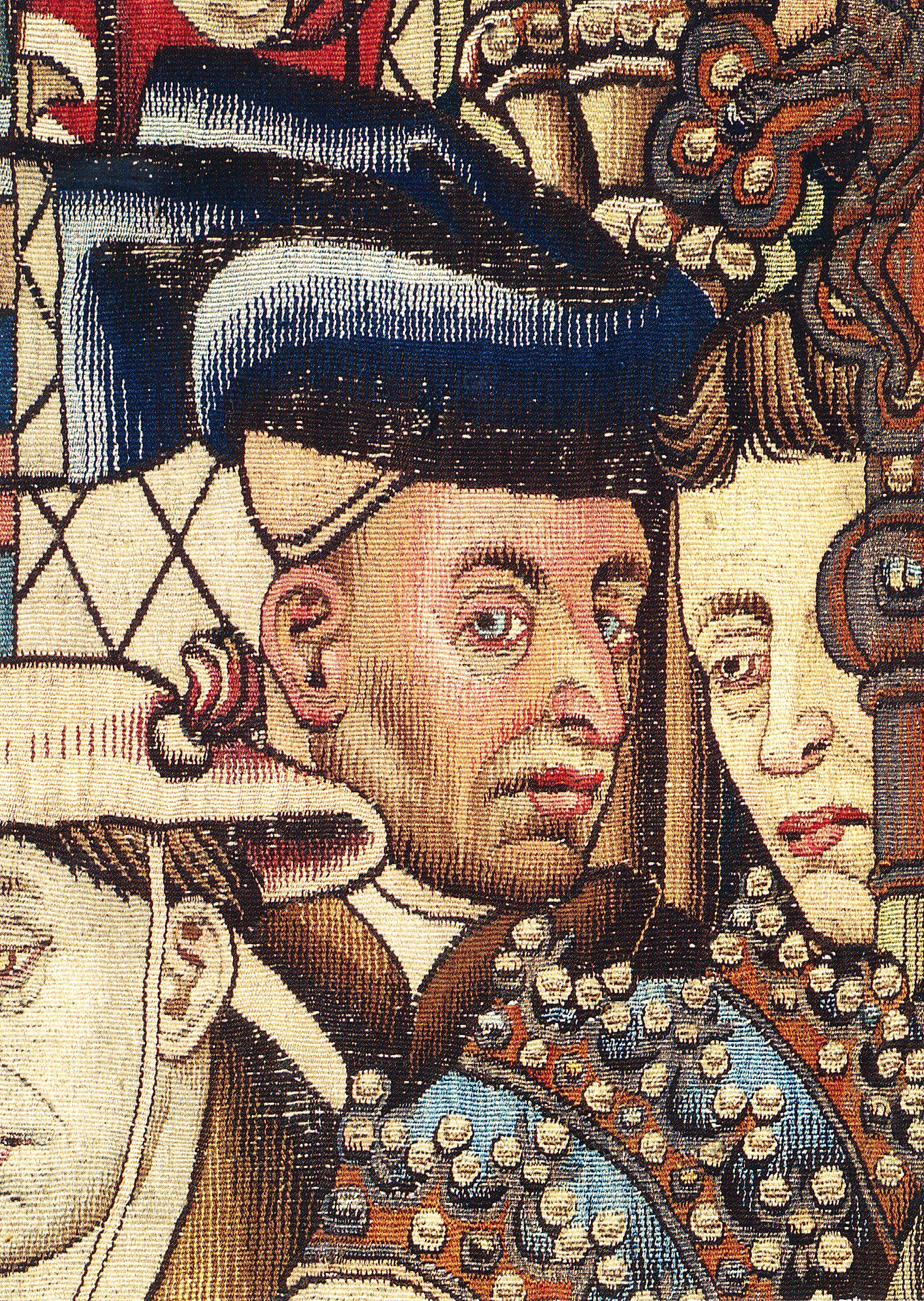
After van der Weyden, The Justice of Trajan and Herkinbald, detail from a lost painting, tapestry copy. This head is considered another probable self-portrait.

What biographical details are available place the artist as a devout Catholic, deeply influenced by mystical and devotional texts, familiar with 12th and 13th century female theologians such as Mechthild of Magdeburg and Hildegard of Bingen. They believed that contemplating devotional images whilst meditating might lead to a vision or a state of ecstasy. It is possible from these teachings that van der Weyden developed a set of devotional motifs such as The Magdalen Reading. The importance of St Luke in Christian art is underscored in St Luke Painting the Virgin, while affirming "the role of art within the context of meditation and contemplation".

The self-portraiture achieves a number of purposes. It acts as a tribute to his own ability, as a measure of his skill against van Eyck, and as a case for the legitimacy of the craft of painting. By portraying himself as St Luke in the act of drawing rather than painting, De Vries believes van der Weyden reveals an "artistic consciousness by commenting upon artistic traditions and by doing so presents a visual argument for the role and function of the artist and his art, one at that time still predominantly religiously defined".

Smith describes the panel as an "exposition of the art of painting", observing that van der Weyden records the essential skills any successful artist should master while claiming to be an heir to St Luke. He works in silverpoint – and thus is unencumbered with the paraphernalia of painting; an easel, seat or other items which might clutter the composition, or more importantly place a physical barrier between the divine and earthly realms.

== Iconography ==
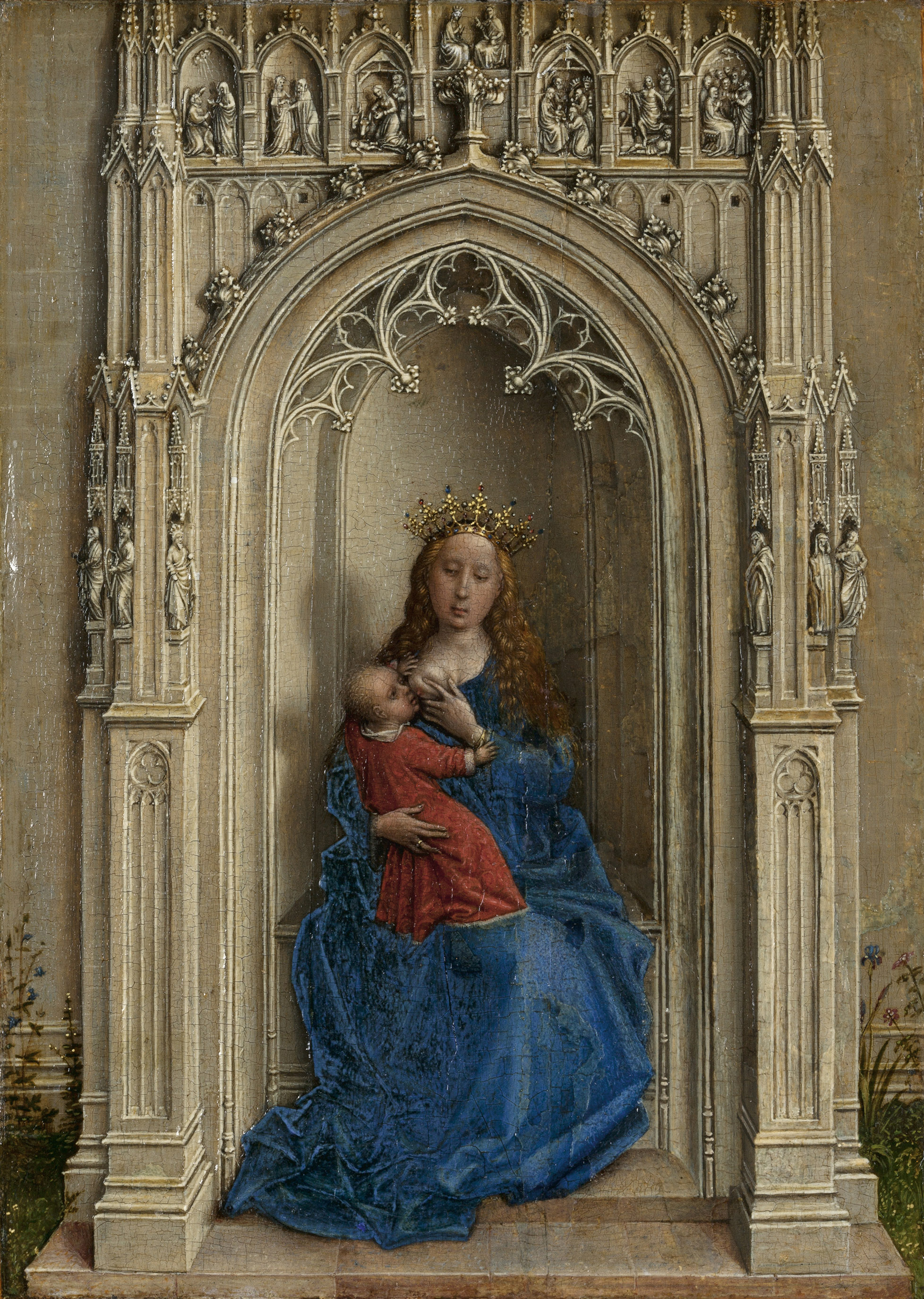
Van der Weyden's small Virgin and Child Enthroned, c. 1430–1432. Museo Thyssen-Bornemisza

The painting is rich in both actual and implied iconography. Van der Weyden presents Mary as the Maria Lactans virgin type, a symbol of "Mother Church" especially popular at times of plague or famine, the implication being that she cares for all and no one will go hungry. This notion ties in with Luke's dual roles of physician (and thus healer) and artist. Van der Weyden had earlier portrayed Mary breast-feeding in his Virgin and Child Enthroned, which depicts equally detailed carvings carrying significance, but is reduced in size and in its cast of characters, and omits the act of beholding.

The architecture of the enclosed space suggests a church. The Virgin sits beneath a canopy, perhaps symbolic of the sacred space, and the spatial separation between the celebrant and the congregation, usually by a Rood screen. The small room to the right could symbolize the vesting chamber. The arms of her throne are painted as carved with figures including Adam, Eve and the serpent before the fall from Paradise. The room faces towards an enclosed garden, another emblem of the Virgin's chastity. Though Mary is positioned by a throne and under a canopy, indicating her role as Queen of Heaven, she sits on the step, an indication of her humility.

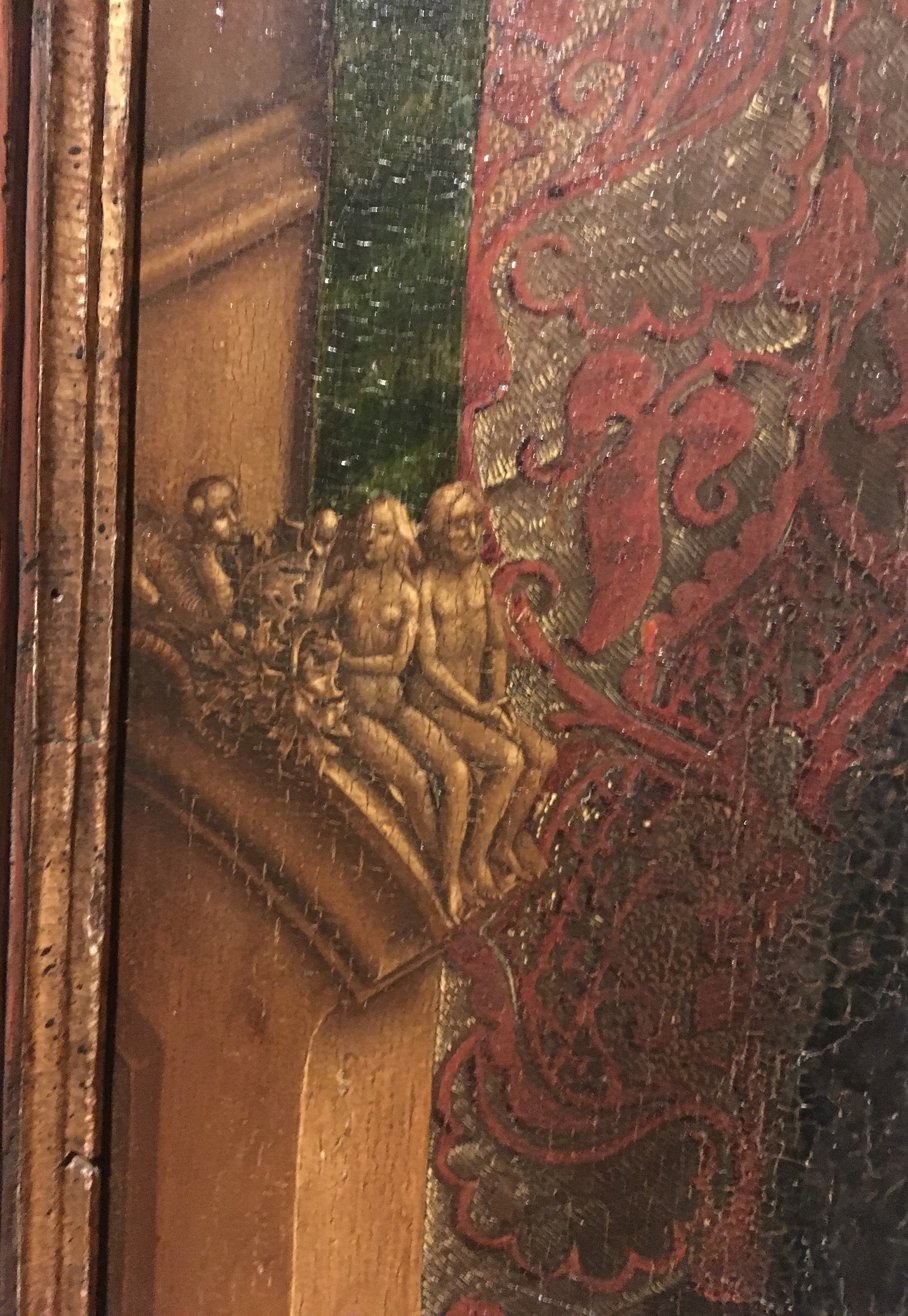
Carvings on the Virgin's throne

The Virgin occupies an earthly space as opposed to a sacred one, but remains aloof. This approach is emphasised by secondary midground figures who are out in the open air, while the main figures are positioned in an elevated room containing a throne, grand arches and wood carvings. Van der Weyden's setting is less artificial than van Eyck's; here Luke and Mary face each other as equals, rather than in van Eyck's painting where, as Blum describes "a divinity and a mortal" face one another. Van der Weyden omits the winged angel holding a crown hovering above the Virgin; the figure was included in the underdrawings, but eventually abandoned. The landscape is more secular than van Eyck's, which is dominated by church spires.

In the late-13th century, many of the newly emerging painter's guilds were nominating Luke as their patron saint. The van der Weyden panel is among the first known depictions of St Luke painting the Virgin in Northern Renaissance art, along with a similar work, a lost triptych panel by Robert Campin. Van der Weyden presents a humanised Virgin and Child, as suggested by the realistic contemporary surroundings, the lack of halos, and the intimate spatial construction. Yet he infuses the panel with extensive religious iconography.

== Attribution and dating ==
During the 19th century the painting was at times associated with Quentin Massys and Hugo van der Goes. In the early 1930s, based on X-radiographs, art historian Alan Burroughs attributed the Boston painting to Dieric Bouts "under the supervision" of van der Weyden. He later revised his opinion to van der Weyden, but art historians remained unsure as to which of the four panel versions was the original or prime version and which were copies. Infrared reflectography has revealed underdrawing in the Boston version which contains heavy redrafting and re-working. This is absent in the other versions, strong evidence the Boston panel is prime. The approach to the underdrawing is very similar to the paintings where attribution to van der Weyden is established, such as the Descent from the Cross in Madrid, and the Miraflores Altarpiece in Berlin. They are built up with brush and ink, with the most attention given to the outlines of the figures and draperies. Hatching is used to indicate areas of deep shadow. In each, the underdrawing is a working sketch, subject to constant revisions, which continued even after painting had begun. The drawing of Mary is similar to the Louvre's silverpoint drawing of 1464 attributed to his circle. Both are of a type van der Weyden was preoccupied with, showing "an ongoing refinement and emphasis on [Mary's] youthfulness ... [which is] traceable throughout his work".

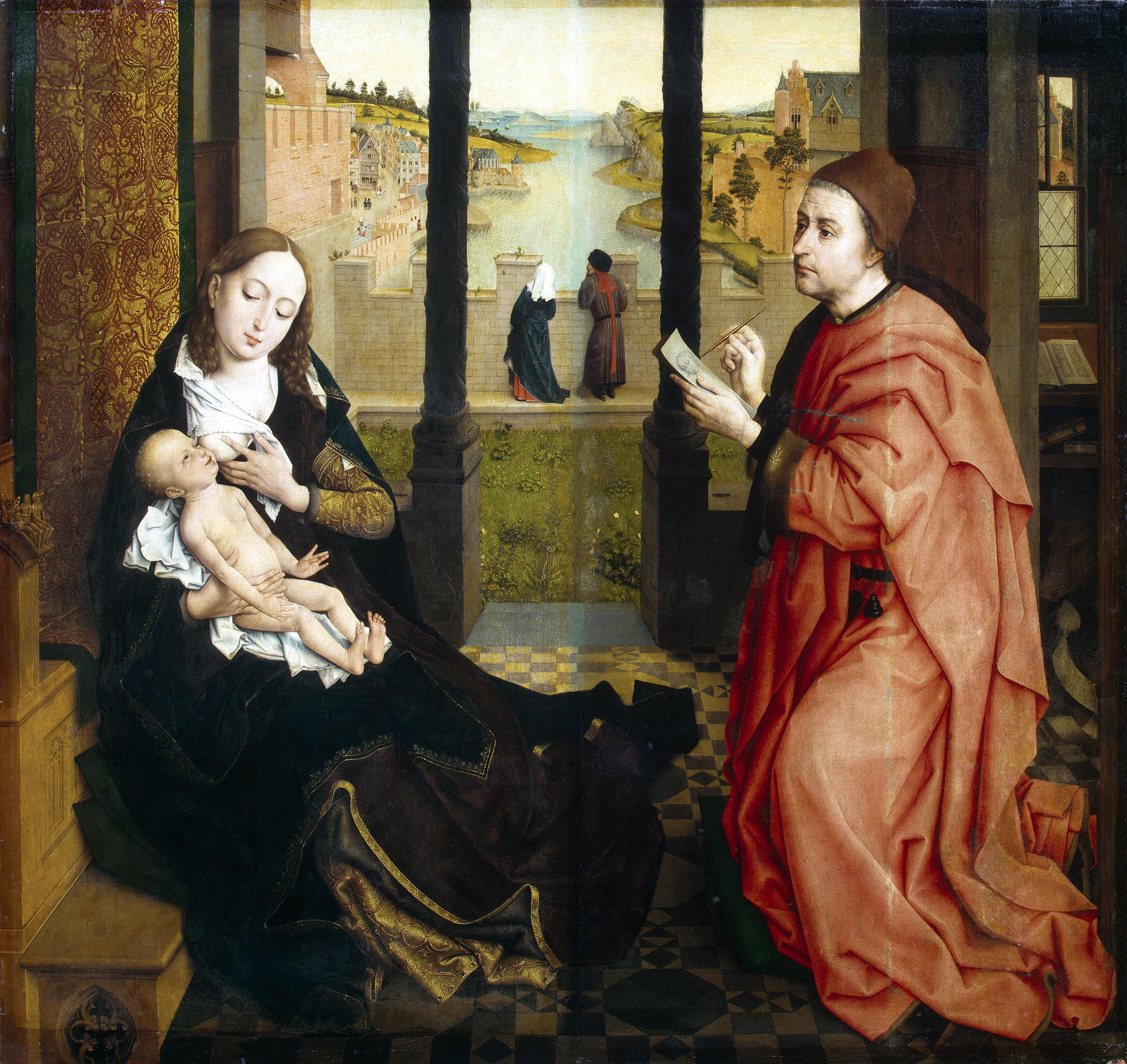
Hermitage Museum, St. Petersburg, c. 1440 (cropped)

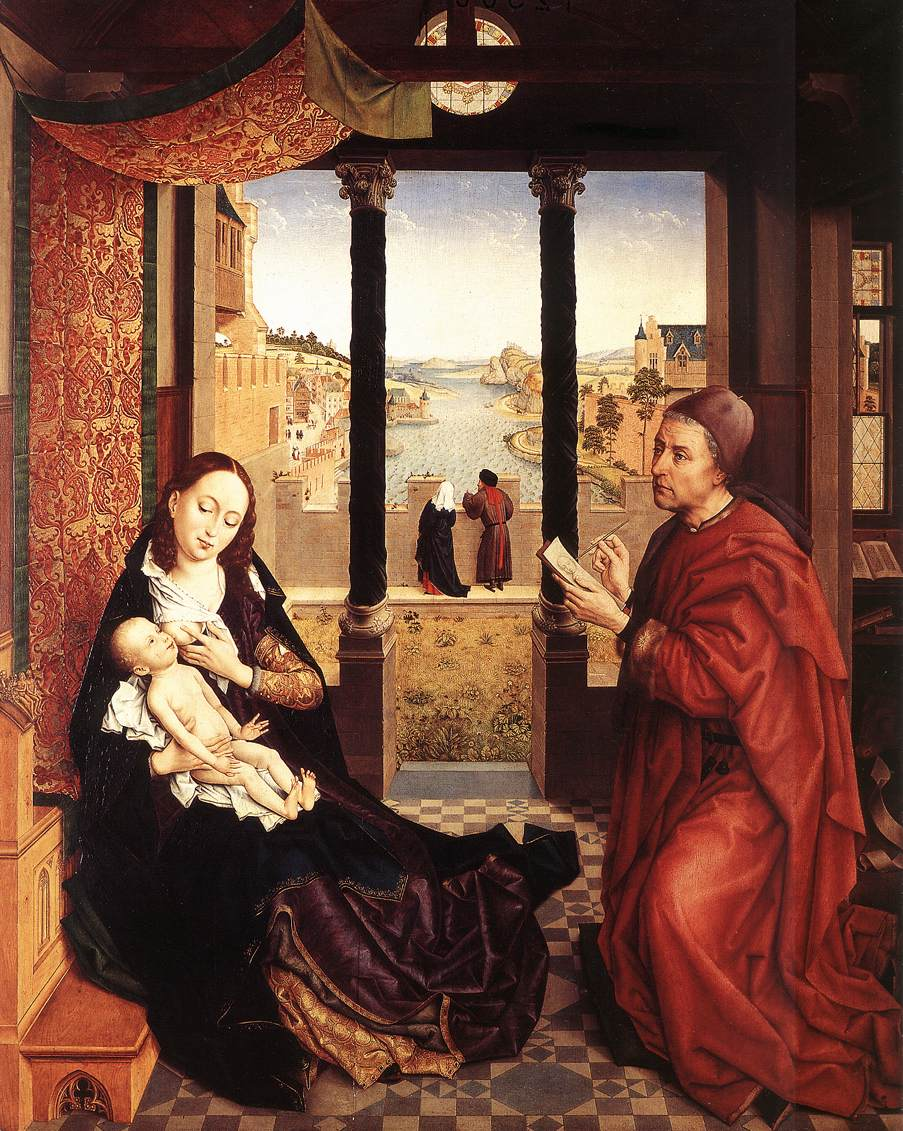
Alte Pinakothek, Munich. c. 1450

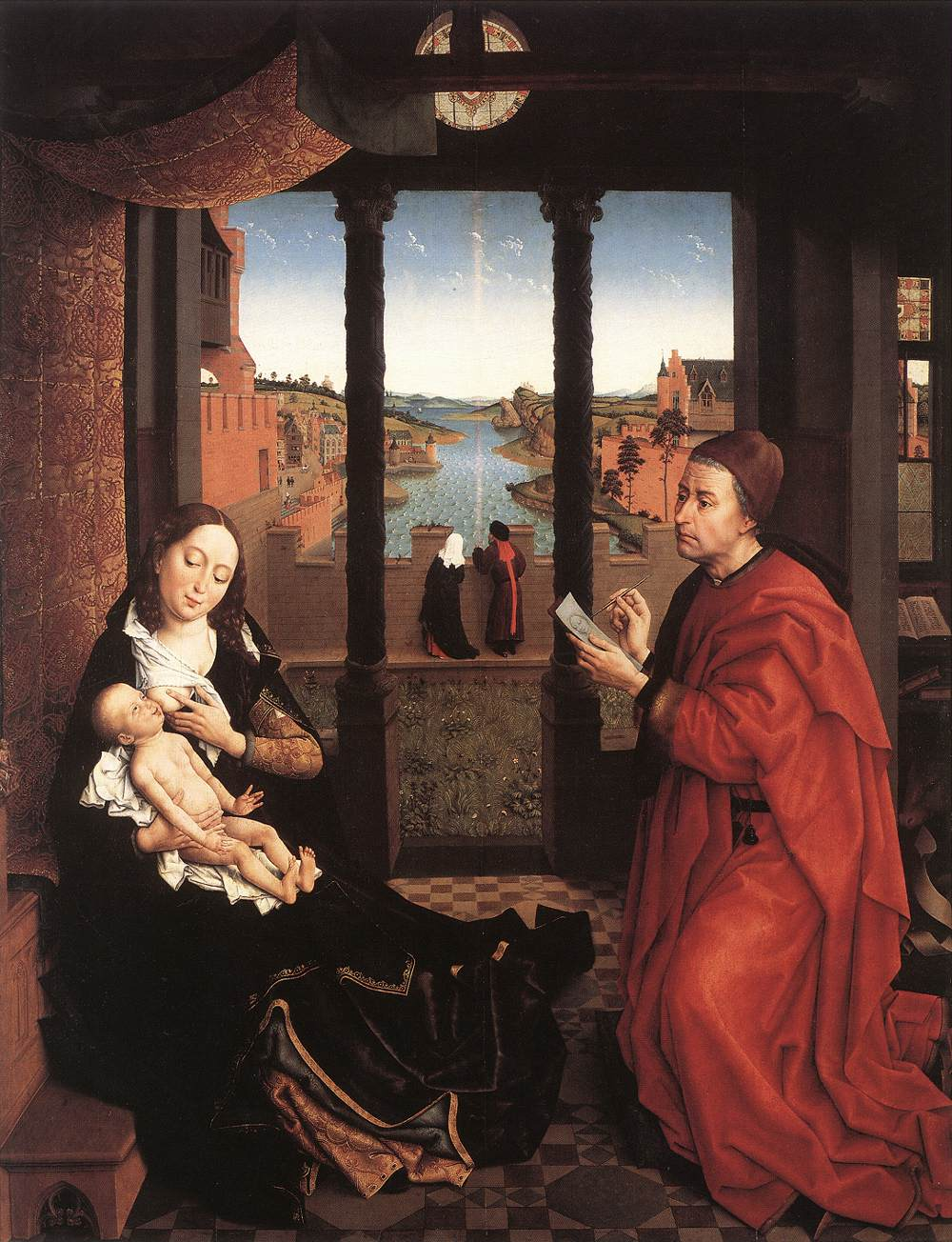
Groeningemuseum, Bruges

Art historians gradually revised their dating from 1450 to the currently accepted 1435–40, earlier in the artist's career. This estimate is based on three factors; the dating of the Rolin Madonna, van der Weyden's opportunity of viewing that panel, and his ability to produce his own work after such a viewing. He is known to have visited Brussels – where van Eyck kept his studio – in 1432 and again 1435. Erwin Panofsky suggested c. 1434 as the earliest possible date, and that the Rolin panel was completed in 1433 or 1434. Julius Held was sceptical of this early dating, noting that if true we are "forced to assume that within one year of Jan's work Rogier received a commission which gave him an opportunity to adopt Jan's compositional pattern while subjecting it at the same time to a very thorough and highly personal transformation, and all this in Bruges, under Jan's very eyes".

Held, as a lone voice and writing in 1955, argues for a date between 1440 and 1443, seeing the work as more advanced than other paintings by the artist from the mid-1430s, and believes it contains "considerable differences" when compared to other early works, especially the Annunciation Triptych of c. 1434. He further observes that although the painting became highly influential, copies did not appear until the mid-century.

Dendrochronological examination of the growth rings in the panel's wood suggests that the timber was felled around 1410. In the 15th century, wood was typically stored for around 20 years before use in panel painting, giving an earliest date in the mid to late 1430s. Analysis of the Munich version places it in the 1480s, around 20 years after van der Weyden's death. The panel in Bruges is in the best condition and of exceptional quality, but dates from c. 1491–1510.

== Provenance and conservation ==
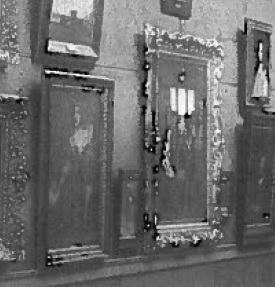
October 1914 photograph of the panel in its old frame. Museum of Fine Arts, Boston

Despite the eminence of the painting and its many copies, little is known of its provenance before the 19th century. It seems likely that it is the painting Albrecht Dürer mentions in his diary recollection of his visit to the Low Countries in 1520. It is probably the same work recorded in a 1574 inventory of Philip II, kept at the Escorial. The painting is recorded in 1835 in the collection of Don Infante Sebastián Gabriel Borbón y Braganza, a grandnephew of Charles III of Spain and himself an artist. Gabriel's inventory notes described the panel in detail, attributed it to Lucas van Leyden, and suggested an earlier restoration. It was donated to the Museum of Fine Arts in 1893 by Henry Lee Higginson after his purchase at a New York auction in 1889. Photographs from 1914 show it in an ornate, decorative frame which is probably the same as in Gabriel's 1835 description.

The panel is in poor condition, with substantial damage to its frame and surface, despite at least four restorations. The earliest recorded restoration was in 1893, the year it was acquired by the Museum of Fine Arts, but there are no surviving records of the treatment. In the early 1930s, the museum's curator of paintings, Philip Henry, described the painting as an original van der Weyden, but gave the opinion that its poor condition was hindering wider acceptance of the attribution. On this basis, it was sent to Germany in 1932 to undergo conservation. The effort was led by the restorer Helmut Ruhemann, who described the panel as "structurally sound", and removed layers of discoloured varnish and "crude overpainting", while filling in some areas of paint loss. Ruhemann believed he had found evidence of at least two major 19th-century restorations, one of which was probably that carried out in Boston in 1893. Ruhemann's cleaning and restoration was widely praised, and contributed to the acceptance of the panel as the original by van der Weyden.

The MFA undertook a third restoration in 1943, when some yellowing of the glaze was repaired. Most recently, the painting was cleaned in 1980 when small amounts of grime were removed, some losses were filled in, and a light coat of varnish was applied.

== Influence ==
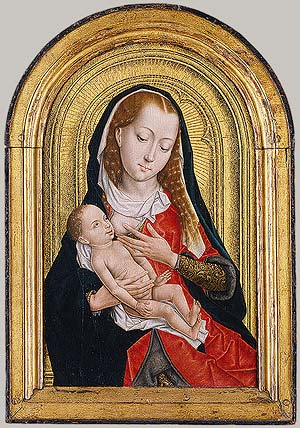
Master of the Legend of St. Ursula, Virgin and Child, late 15th century

If the painting was in the Guild of Saint Luke's chapel in Brussels, then many near-contemporary artists would have been able to view it. Van der Weyden's interpretation was hugely influential during the mid-15th and early-16th centuries, both in free and faithful adaptations and copies, examples of which are in Brussels, Kassel, Valladolid and Barcelona. This reflects its quality, and the fact that he presents an ideal image of an artist as a self-portrait, legitimising and elevating the trade. Also influential was his Madonna type, which he used again for the c. 1450 Diptych of Jean de Gros. That painting features a 'Virgin and Child' wing directly modelled on his St Luke panel, extending the devotional aspect to include a donor who appears in the same panel with her. In combining the patron with the Virgin, the "artist has made that personal devotion an integral part of the image".

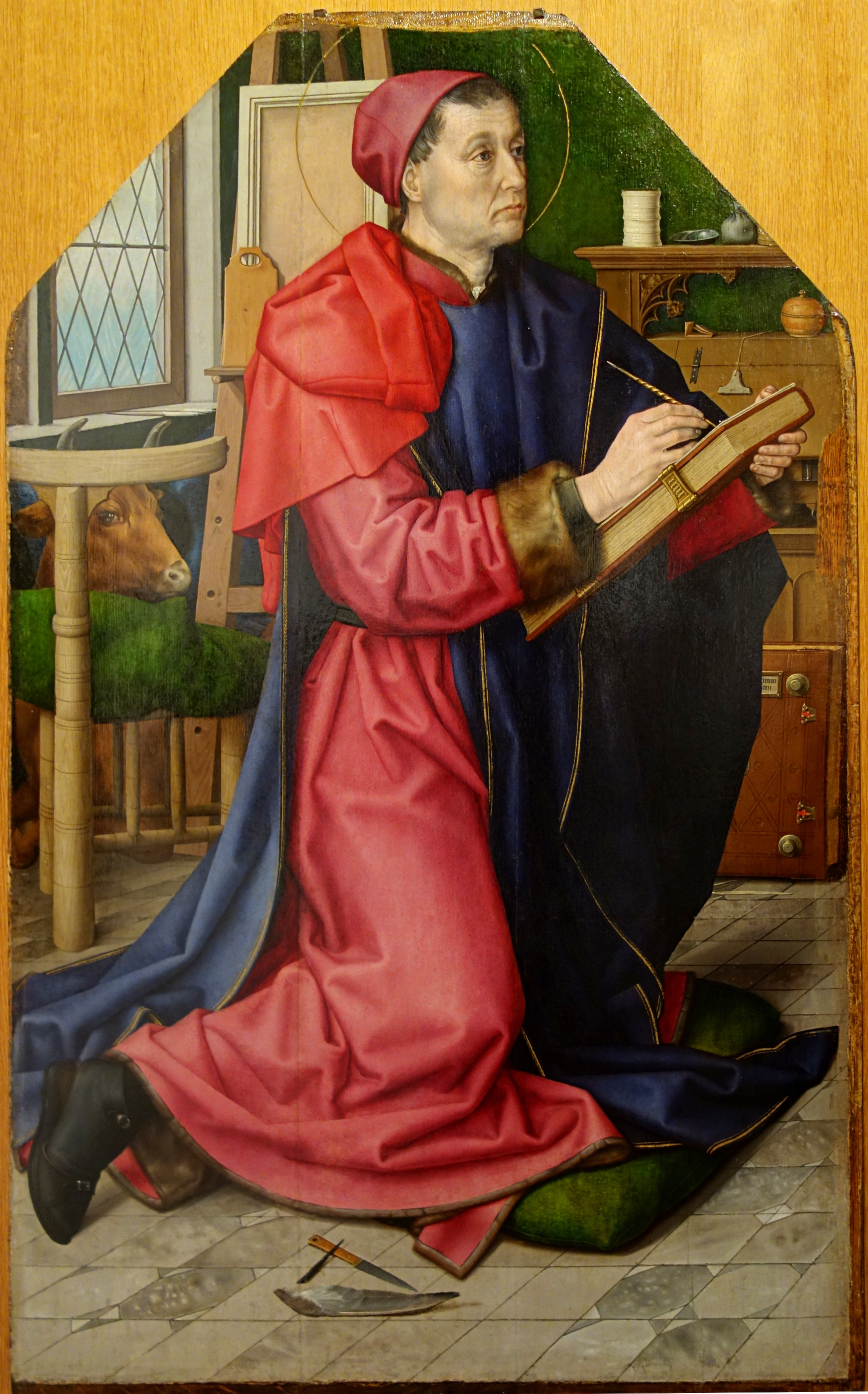
Hugo van der Goes, Saint Luke Drawing the Virgin, c. 1470–80. National Museum of Ancient Art, Lisbon

Depictions of Luke drawing the Virgin rose in popularity in the mid-to-late 15th century, with van der Weyden's panel the earliest known from the Low Countries – Campin's earlier treatment was by then lost. Most were free copies (adaptations) of van der Weyden's design. The anonymous painter known as the Master of the Legend of St. Ursula incorporated the Maria Lactans type for his Virgin and Child, now in New York. Other artists producing works directly influenced by van der Weyden's portrait include Hugo van der Goes, Dieric Bouts, Derick Baegert and Jan Gossaert. Some artists copied van der Weyden by placing their own likeness in place of St Luke, notably Simon Marmion and Maarten van Heemskerck. By representing themselves as Luke, artists implied a depiction of the Virgin based on first hand contact and thus giving her true likeness.

Van der Goes's is the earliest extant autographed version, and one of the most important. This panel was originally a diptych wing of which the accompanying panel of the Virgin and Child is lost, and was probably made for a guild. Luke is dressed in a heavy red robe, draws a preparatory sketch in silverpoint, and wears a melancholy expression. Building on van der Weyden's theme of the role, practice and craft of an artist, van der Goes places pieces of charcoal, a knife and the feathers of a small bird in front of the saint. The similarities to the van der Weyden are many and striking, and include the painting utensils, red robes, physician's cap and blue mantle. The figure has the same middle-aged facial type and his pose, kneeling on a green cushion, although reversed compared to van der Weyden's, is the same. Van der Goes's adaption both increased van der Weyden's standing in the eyes of the later artist's followers, and led to a new group of copies that were modelled on the later painting.

A tapestry version woven in Brussels c. 1500 is now in the Louvre. It was probably designed using a reversed drawing of the painting.

=== Left panel ===
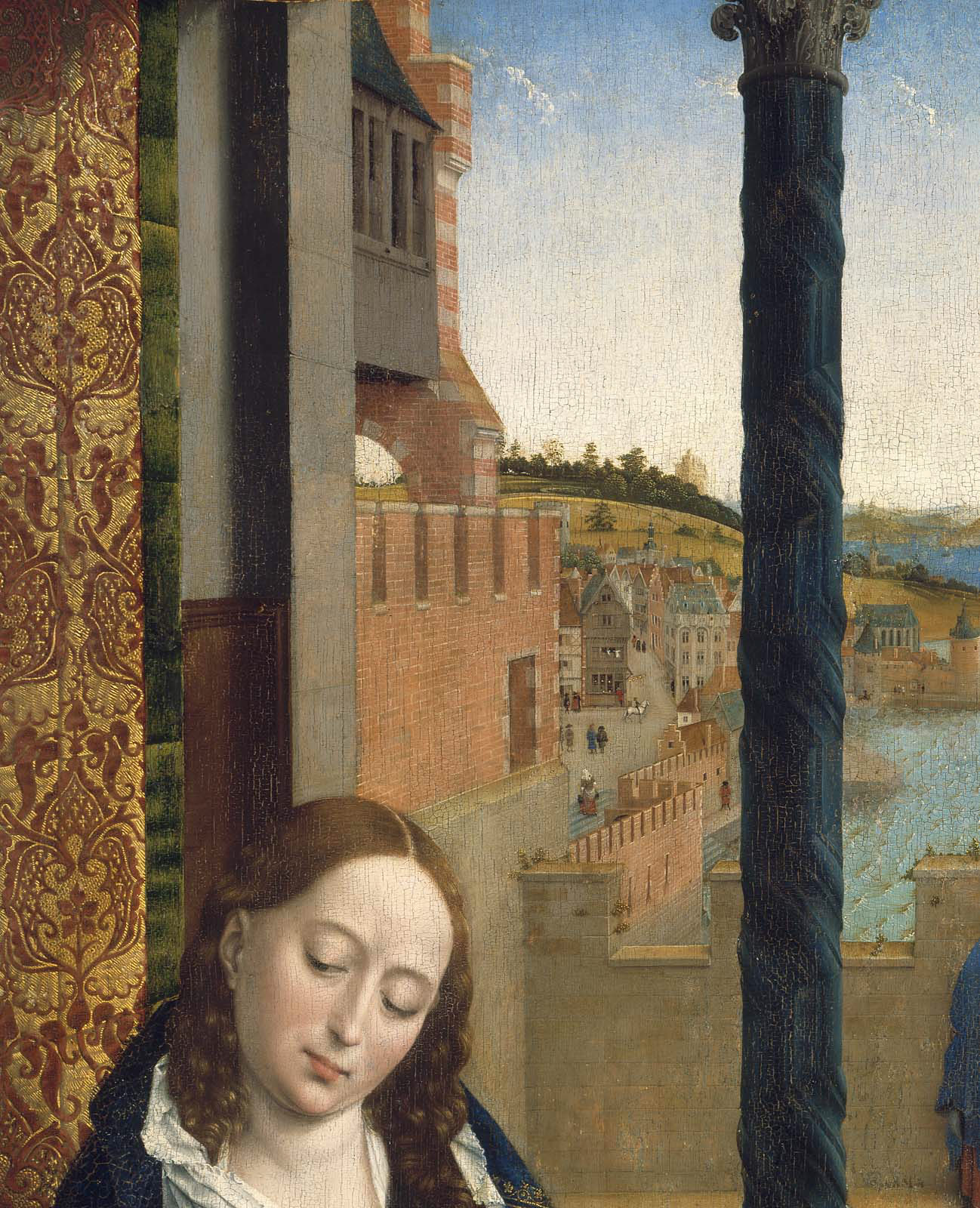
Detail of the view beyond the head of the Virgin

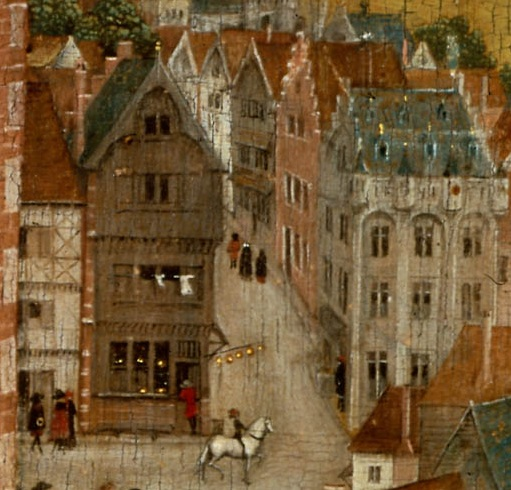
Detail of the town in the distance

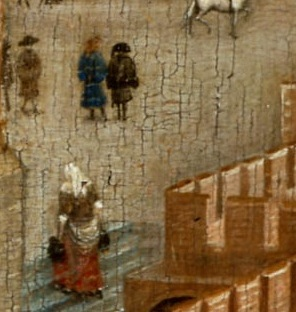
Detail of figures walking in the far background

== See also ==
- List of works by Rogier van der Weyden
