= Fragments of a Cope with the Seven Sacraments =

15th-century cope

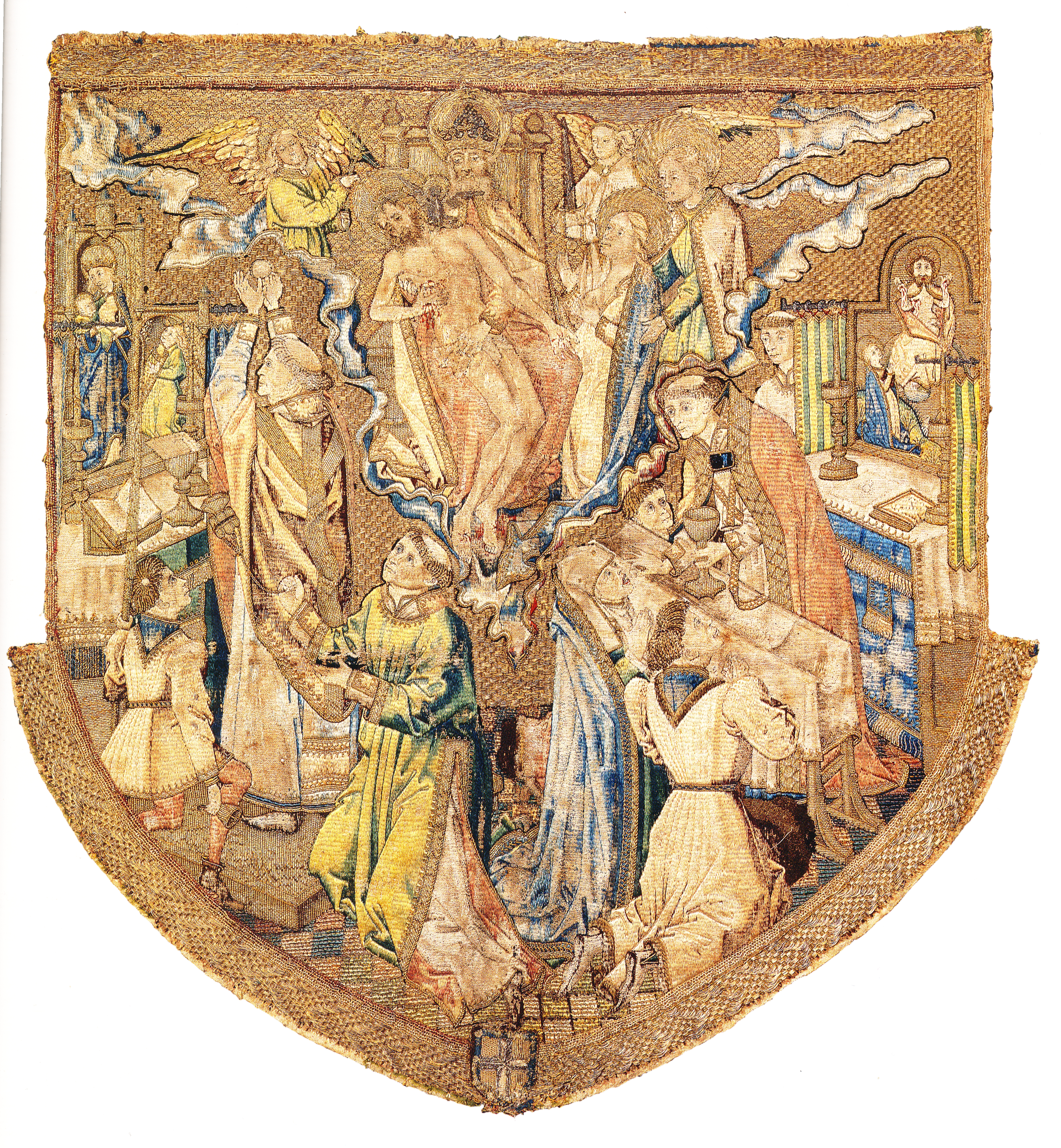
- Artist: circle of Rogier van der Weyden
- Year: 1463–1478
- Type: Embroidery
- Location: Bern Historical Museum; Bern
- Accession: 308A-B
- Website: Museum page

Fragments of a Cope with the Seven Sacraments refers to a 15th-century cope in the collection of the Bern Historical Museum. It is part of the church treasure from the Cathedral of Lausanne sent to Bern after the Protestant conquest of Canton Vaud in 1536. The cope can be attributed to a master from the Netherlands in the circle of Rogier van der Weyden and was probably executed in Tournai where van der Weyden had a workshop from 1432 onwards.

== Description ==
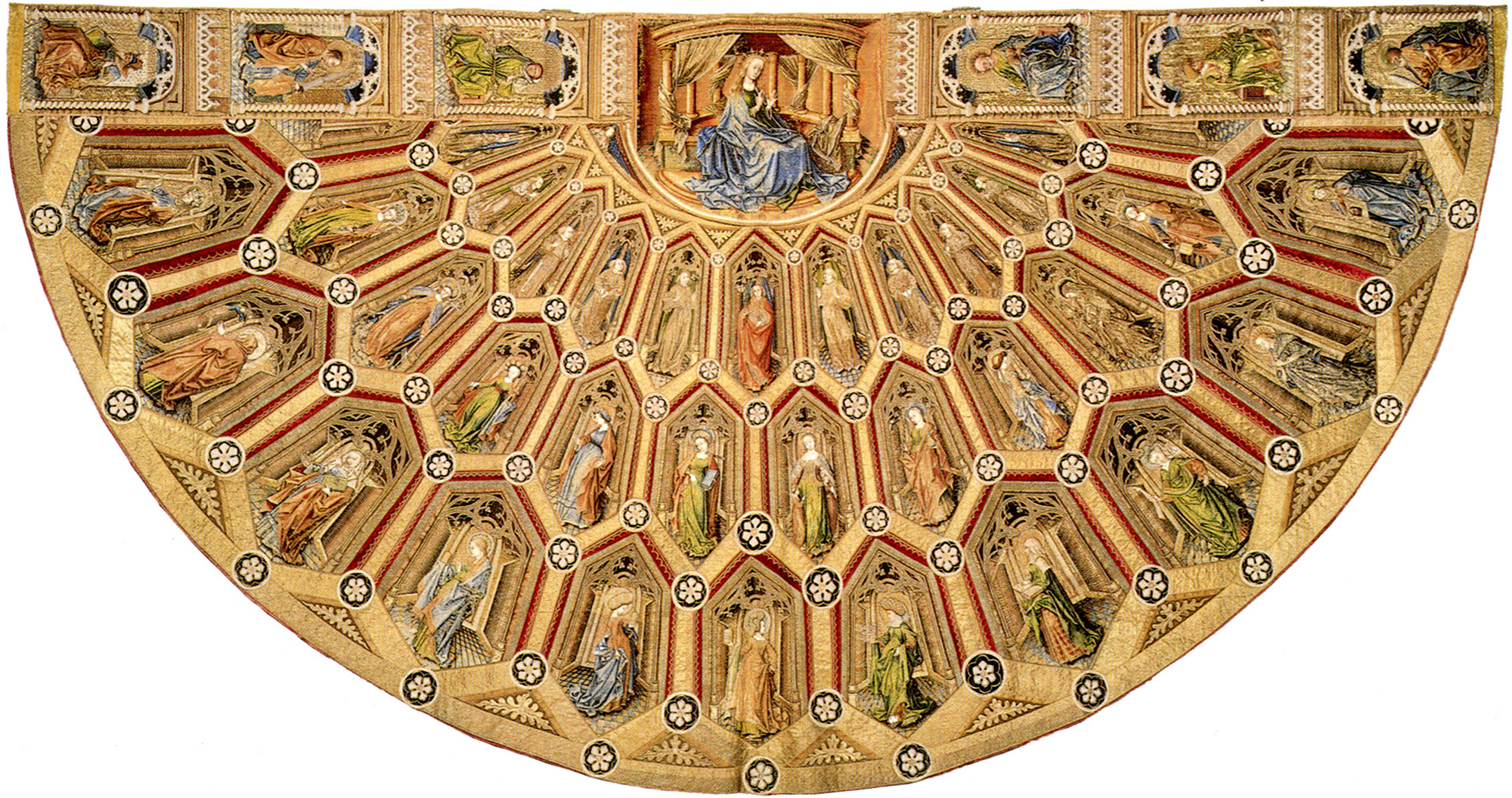
Mantle of the Vestments of the Order of the Golden Fleece, Imperial Treasury, Vienna

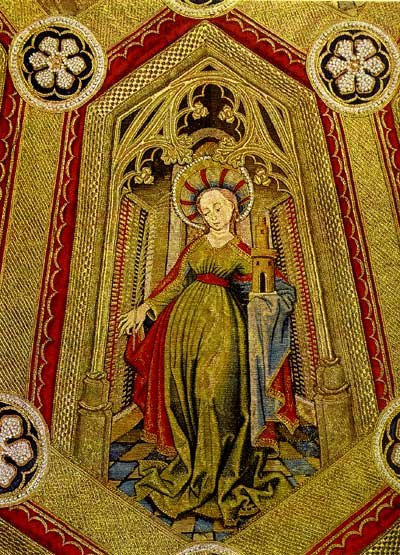
Detail of the Mantle of the Vestments of the Order of the Golden Fleece

The piece pictured is the hood. It depicts the Eucharist in the new tradition of the Devotio Moderna that arose in the Netherlands in the fifteenth century. The embroidery uses one of the most expensive of the Tournai embroiders' techniques, the or nué (shaded gold) technique in which the juxtaposed gold threads are more or less closely covered by silk threads. A famous example of this kind of work is the Mantle of the Vestments of the Order of the Golden Fleece dating from around 1425–1450 and now at the Imperial Treasury, Vienna.

The cope was commissioned by Jacques of Savoy, Count of Romont and presented by him to the Bishop of Lausanne. The Coat of Arms of the Counts of Savoy is embroidered at the bottom and indicating that the work was made before 1478, the year Jacques of Savoy was admitted to the Order of the Golden Fleece, as it lacks the Collar of the Golden Fleece.

== See also ==
- The Justice of Trajan and Herkinbald

== Bibliography ==
Campbell, Lorne and Van der Stock, Jan. (ed.) Rogier van der Weyden: 1400–1464. Master of Passions. Leuven: Davidsfonds, 2009. ISBN 978-90-8526-105-6, pp. 370 - 418
