= Jacobus de Voragine =

Italian chronicler and archbishop of Genoa (c. 1230–1298)

Blessed Jacobus de Voragine OP
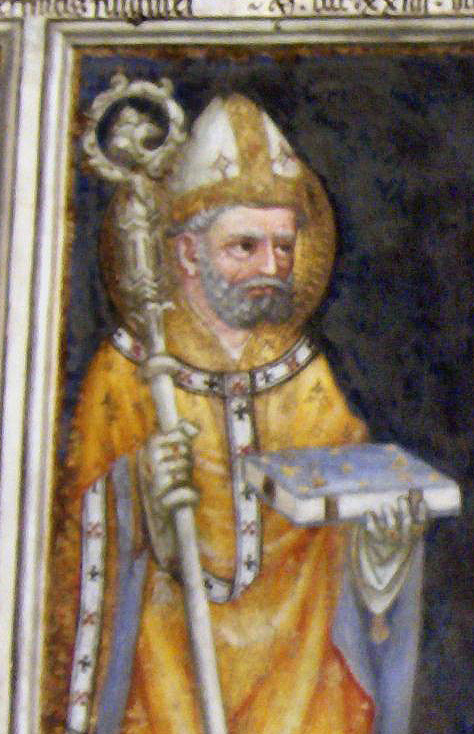
- Jacobus de Voragine with the Golden Legend in his hand, fresco by Ottaviano Nelli, chapel of Trinci Palace, Foligno, Italy
- Born: c. 1230; Varagine, Republic of Genoa (present-day Varazze, Liguria, Italy)
- Died: 13 or 16 July 1298 or 1299; Genoa, Republic of Genoa (present-day Genoa, Liguria, Italy)
- Venerated in: Catholic Church
- Beatified: 11 May 1816, Genoa by Pope Pius VII
- Feast: 13 July

Jacobus de Voragine, (Note: His first name in Latin is Jacobus, Iacobus or Iacopus, while in Italian it is Jacopo, Iacopo or Giacomo, which in English is "James". In Latin his surname is de Voragine or de Varagine, in Italian da Varagine or da Varazze. The surname is a family name, meaning "from Varazze". The spelling Voragine is a variant of Varagine and does not derive from vorāgō, vorāginis ('abyss'), as sometimes claimed.) OP (c. 1230 – 13/16 July 1298) was an Italian chronicler and archbishop of Genoa. He was the author, or more accurately the compiler, of the Golden Legend, a collection of the legendary lives of the greater saints of the medieval church that was one of the most popular religious works of the Middle Ages.

== Biography ==
Jacobus was born either in Varazze or in Genoa, where a family originally from Varazze and bearing that name is attested at the time. He entered the Dominican order in 1244, and became the prior at Como, Bologna and Asti in succession. Besides preaching with success in many parts of Italy, he also taught in the schools of his own fraternity. He was provincial of Lombardy from 1267 till 1286, when he was removed at the meeting of the order in Paris. He also represented his own province at the councils of Lucca (1288) and Ferrara (1290). On the last occasion he was one of the four delegates charged with signifying Pope Nicholas IV's desire for the deposition of Munio de Zamora – who had been master of the Dominican order from 1285 and was eventually deprived of his office by a papal bull dated 12 April 1291.

In 1288 Nicholas empowered him to absolve the people of Genoa for their offence in aiding the Sicilians against Charles II. Early in 1292 the same pope, himself a Franciscan, summoned Jacobus to Rome, intending to consecrate him archbishop of Genoa. Jacobus reached Rome on Palm Sunday (30 March), only to find his patron ill of a deadly sickness, from which he died on Good Friday (4 April). The cardinals, however, propter honorem Communis Januae ("for the honor of the commune of Genoa"), determined to carry out this consecration on the Sunday after Easter. He was a good bishop, and especially distinguished himself by his efforts to appease the civil discords of Genoa among Guelphs and Ghibellines. A story, mentioned by Échard as unworthy of credit, makes Pope Boniface VIII, on the first day of Lent, cast the ashes in the archbishop's eyes instead of on his head, with the words, "Remember that thou art a Ghibelline, and with thy fellow Ghibellines wilt return to naught."

He died in 1298 or 1299, and was buried in the Dominican church at Genoa. He was beatified by Pius VII in 1816.

== Works ==
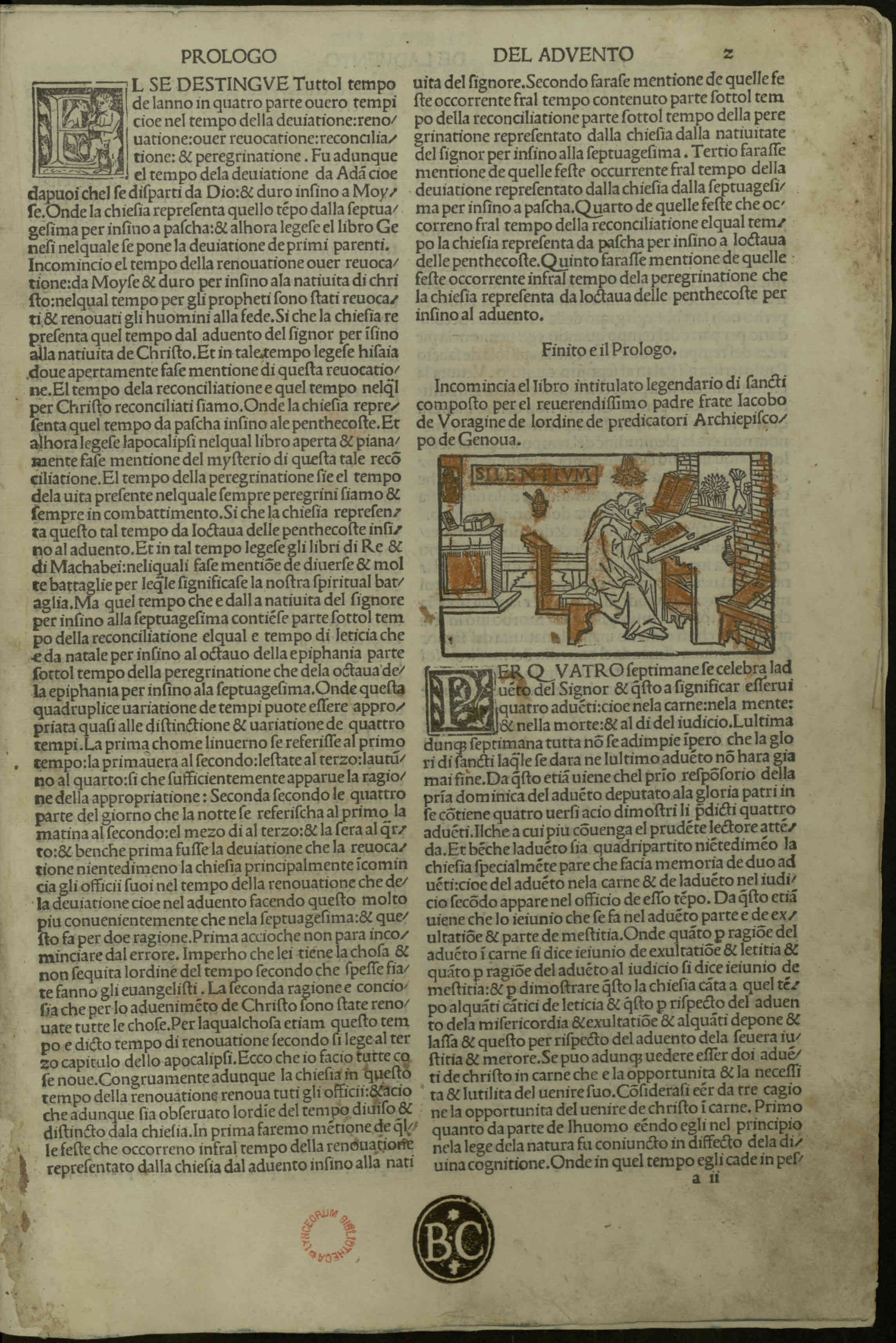
Legenda aurea (1499)

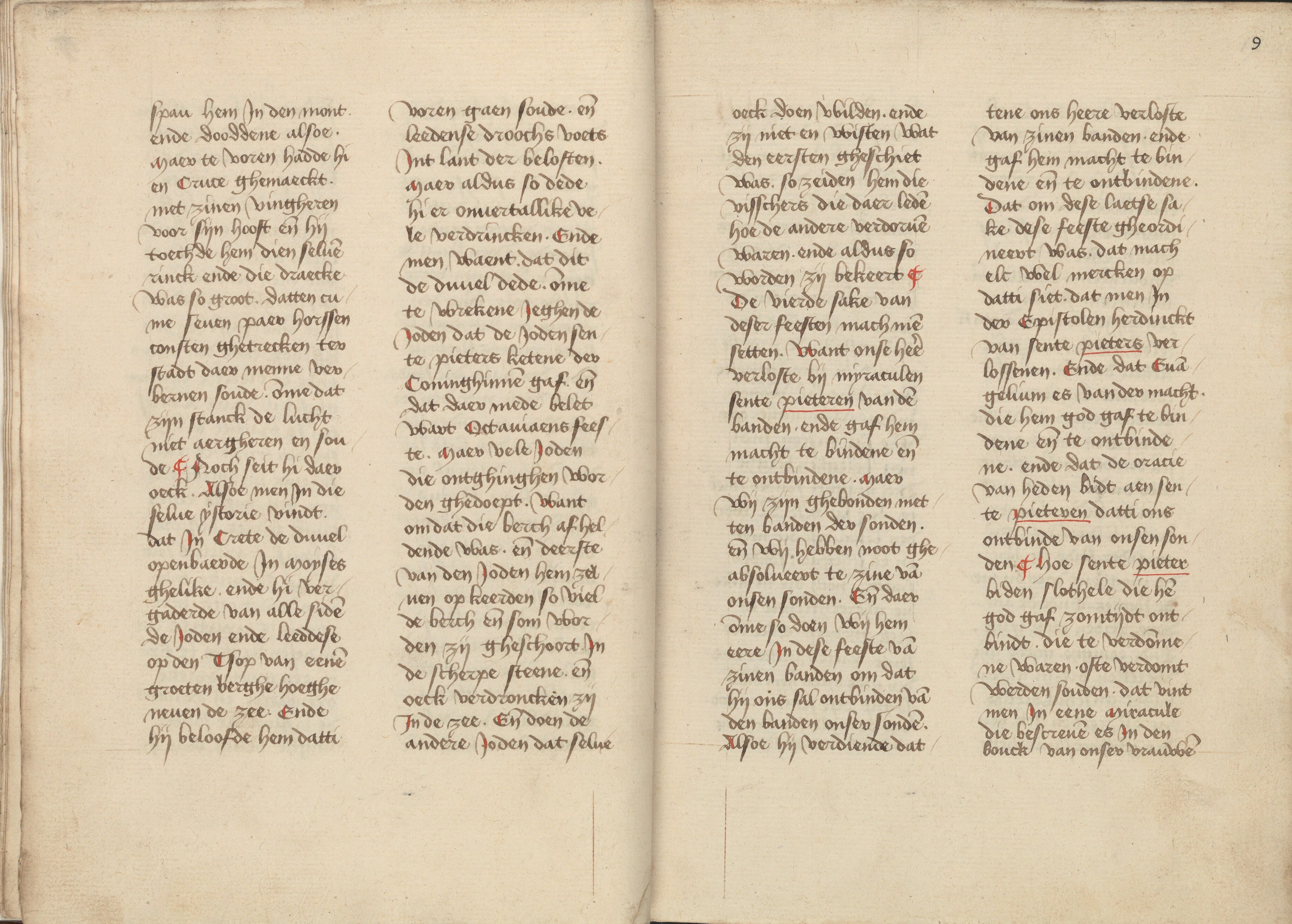
Excerpt from the manuscript "Heiliglevens in het Middelnederlands". A fifteenth century copy from the second part of the Legenda Aurea.

Jacobus de Voragine left a list of his own works. Speaking of himself in his Chronicon januense, he says: "While he was in his order, and after he had been made archbishop, he wrote many works. For he compiled the legends of the saints (Legenda sanctorum) in one volume, adding many things from the Historia tripartita et scholastica, and from the chronicles of many writers."

The other writings he claims are two anonymous volumes of Sermons concerning all the Saints whose yearly feasts the church celebrates. Of these volumes, he adds, one is very diffuse, but the other short and concise. Then follow Sermones de omnibus evangeliis dominicalibus for every Sunday in the year; Sermones de omnibus evangeliis, i.e., a book of discourses on all the Gospels, from Ash Wednesday to the Tuesday after Easter; and a treatise called Marialis, qui totus est de B. Maria compositus, consisting of about 160 discourses on the attributes, titles, etc., of the Virgin Mary. In the same work the archbishop claims to have written his Chronicon januense in the second year of his episcopate (1293), but it extends to 1296 or 1297.

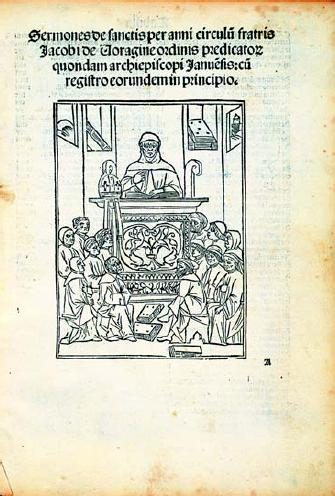
Title page of the 1497 edition of the Sermones de sanctis showing the author as a preacher, National Library of Poland.

To Jacobus' own list his biographer Giovanni Monleone adds several other works, such as a defence of the Dominicans, printed at Venice in 1504, and a Summa virtutum et vitiorum Guillelmi Peraldi, a Dominican who died in 1271. Jacobus is also said by Sixtus of Siena (Biblioth. Sacra, lib. ix) to have translated the Old and New Testaments into his own tongue. "But," adds the historian of the Dominican order Jacques Échard, "if he did so, the version lies so closely hid that there is no recollection of it," and it may be added that it is highly improbable that the man who compiled the Golden Legend ever conceived the necessity of having the Scriptures in the vernacular.

=== The Golden Legend ===
The Golden Legend, one of the most popular religious works of the Middle Ages, is a collection of the legendary lives of the greater saints of the medieval Catholic Church. The preface divides the ecclesiastical year into four periods corresponding to the various epochs of the world's history, a time of deviation, of renovation, of reconciliation and of pilgrimage. The book itself, however, falls into five sections: (a) from Advent to Christmas (cc. 1–5); (b) from Christmas to Septuagesima (6–30); (c) from Septuagesima to Easter (31–53); (d) from Easter Day to the octave of Pentecost (54–76); (e) from the octave of Pentecost to Advent (77–180). The saints' lives are full of fanciful legend, and in not a few cases contain accounts of 13th century miracles wrought at special places, particularly with reference to the Dominicans. The penultimate chapter (181), "De Sancto Pelagio Papa", contains a universal history from the point of view of Lombardy, or Historia Lombardica (History of Lombardy"), from the middle of the 6th century. The last (182) is a somewhat allegorical disquisition on the dedication of churches, "De dedicatione ecclesiae".

The Golden Legend was translated into Catalan in the 13th century and a first dated version was published in Barcelona in 1494. A French version was made by Jean Belet de Vigny in the 14th century. A Latin edition is assigned to about 1469; and a dated one was published at Lyon in 1473. Many other Latin editions were printed before the end of the century. A French translation by Master John Bataillier is dated 1476; Jean de Vigny's appeared at Paris, 1488; an Italian one by Nic. Manerbi (?Venice, 1475); a Czech one at Plzeň, 1475–1479, and at Prague, 1495; Caxton's English versions, 1483, 1487, and 1493; and a German one in 1489. Overall, during the first five decades of printing in Europe, editions of the Legenda Aurea appeared at a rate of about two per year.

=== Sermones and Mariale ===
Almost as popular as the Legenda Aurea were Jacobus' collected sermons, also termed Aurei. Several 15th-century editions of the Sermons are also known; while his Mariale was printed at Venice in 1497 and at Paris in 1503.

=== Chronicon januense ===
Jacobus' other chief work is his Chronicon januense, a history of Genoa. It is divided into twelve parts. The first four deal with the mythical history of the city from the time of its founder, Janus, called the first king of Italy, and its enlarger, a second Janus, "citizen of Troy", till its conversion to Christianity "about twenty-five years after the passion of Christ". The fifth part professes to treat of the beginning, growth and perfection of the city; but of the first period the writer candidly confesses he knows nothing except by hearsay. The second period includes the Genoese crusading exploits in the East, and extends to their victory over the Pisans (c. 1130), while the third reaches down to the author's days as archbishop. The sixth part deals with the constitution of the city, the seventh and eighth with the duties of rulers and citizens, the ninth with those of domestic life. The tenth gives the ecclesiastical history of Genoa from the time of its first known bishop, Saint Valentine, "whom we believe to have lived about 530 A.D.", until 1133, when the city was raised to archiepiscopal rank. The eleventh contains the lives of all the bishops in order, and includes the chief events during their episcopates; the twelfth deals in the same way with the archbishops, not forgetting the writer himself.

== Marian views ==
Jacobus is relevant to mariology in light of his numerous Marian sermons, Sermones de sanctis per circulum anni feliciter and his Laudes Beatae Mariae Virginis. He describes the miracles of Mary and explains specific local customs and usages on Marian feast days. Since most of these usages do not exist anymore, Jacobus de Varagine serves as a valuable source for the study of medieval Marian customs. Theologically Jacobus is one of the first of several Christian writers, who view Mary as mediatrix or mediator between God and humanity. In his view of the mystical body of Christ, she is the neck through which all graces flow from Christ to his body. This view was later shared by others such as Bernardino of Siena, and, most recently, by one of the noted mariologists of the 20th century, Gabriel Roschini.

== Editions ==
- Iacopo da Varazze, Legenda aurea G. P. Maggioni (ed.), Firenze, 1998.
- Ryan, William G., ed. The Golden Legend: Readings on the Saints. Volume 1 and volume 2. Princeton, NJ: Princeton Univ. Press, 1993.
- Pieter van Os (September 1, 1490). Legenda aurea sanctorum, sive Lombardica historia (in Latin and German). Vol. II – via archive.org.
