= Munio of Zamora =

His Excellency, the Most Reverend Lord Brother Munio of Zamora, O.P.
- Bishop of Palencia
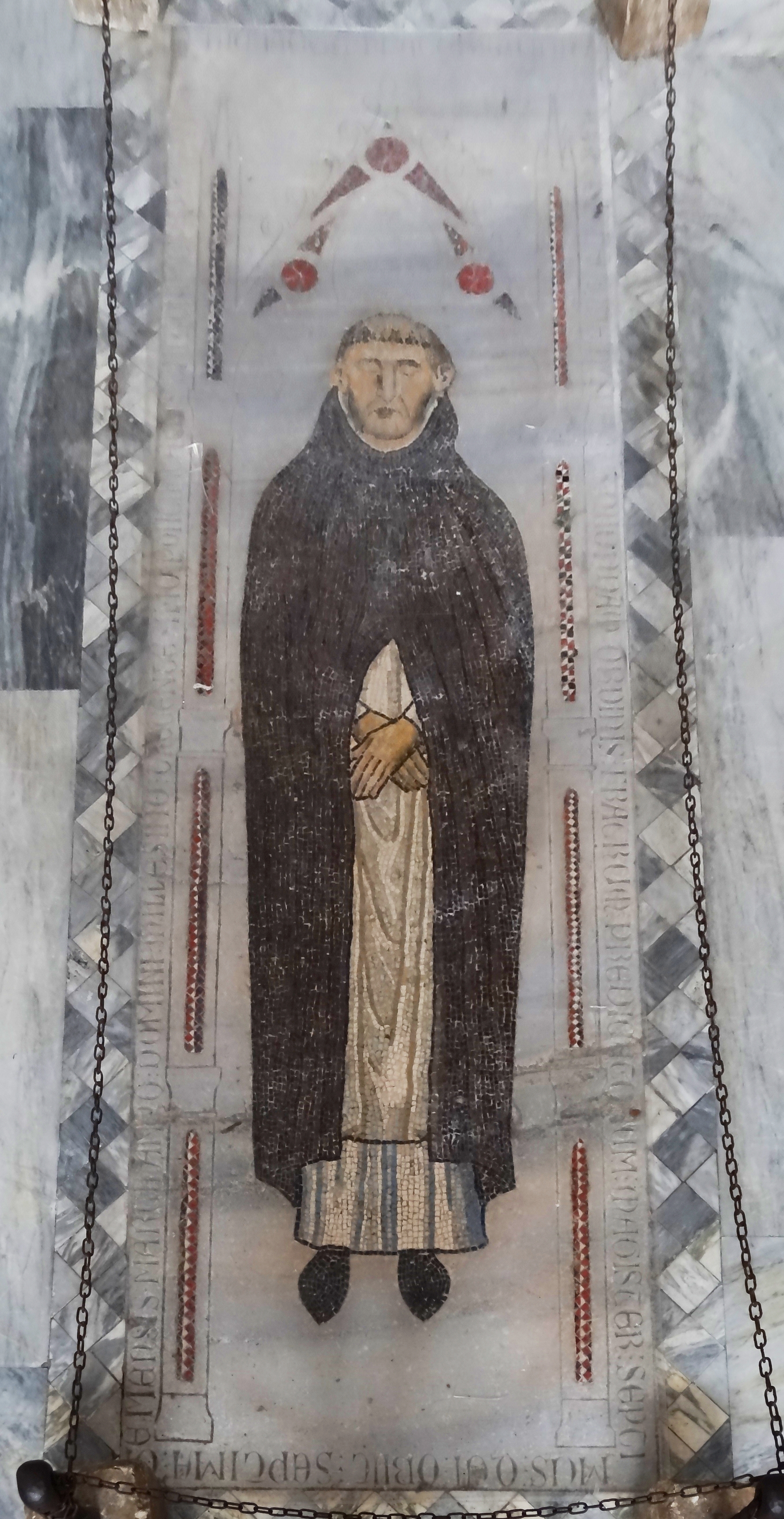
- Diocese: Diocese of Palencia
- Installed: 1294
- Term ended: 1300
- Other post: Master General of the Dominican Order (1285-1291)

Orders
- Consecration: 1294

Personal details
- Born: 1237 Zamora (current day Castile-León, Spain)
- Died: 19 February 1300 (aged 62–63) Rome, Italy
- Buried: Basilica of Santa Sabina; Rome, Italy
- Denomination: Roman Catholic

Munio of Zamora, O.P., (1237 – 19 February 1300) was a Spanish Dominican friar who became the seventh Master General of the Dominican Order in 1285, and later a bishop.

== Life ==
=== Spain ===
No details of Munio's early life are recorded, but he is assumed to have been born in Zamora. What is known of him comes from diverse sources, of varying value, and giving contradictory judgments. It would appear that he had a reputation of being an excellent administrator, when he was appointed as Prior Provincial of his native country in 1281. He was also known as being an ascetic man, practicing perpetual abstinence, though he also came to be known for his leniency towards those under his authority.

One notable difference he had from his predecessors was that he did not have the academic background which they did, never having studied at the great universities of Italy or France, and thus not having a Master's degree. Administration was his sole talent.

=== Master General ===
Munio, in his office as Prior Provincial, took part in the General Chapter of the Order, held in Bologna in 1285. When he was nominated as Master of the Order at that gathering, the French contingent of the Chapter objected to him based on his alleged lack of studies appropriate to the office. Nevertheless, the Chapter elected him.

The state of the Order as a whole at the time of Munio's election required a man of his gifts. The rapid growth of the Order had often been accomplished with minimal training of its new members. Discipline had become a major concern of Munio's predecessors, who issued frequent appeals to the friars and nuns of the Order to maintain the spirit of the Rule. Men were joining who claimed to have already the gift of preaching, and demanded to do so without any restrictions on the part of the Order.

In his first letter to the Order at large after his election, Munio issues a serious call to the friars and nuns to keep a spirit of poverty more strenuously, as well as an adherence to solitude and silence. He concludes:

May the zeal of the Order revive in you all! For I tell you with a heart filled with bitterness that, among many of you, this zeal has lost its first vigor.

==== The Third Order ====
Shortly after his election as Master, Munio promulgated the Rule of the Brothers and Sisters of Penance of the Blessed Dominic (Regula Fratrum et Sororum Ordinis de Paenitentiae Beati Dominici), which provided a rule of life (lasting into the 21st century) for the "penitent" laymen and women who had been leading lives inspired by the friars, long called the Third Order of St. Dominic. In the opening passages, the Rule lays down these prerequisites: "They must be filled with the utmost jealous, burning zeal, after their own fashion, for the truth of Catholic faith".

The Master of the Order thus offered an opportunity to lay people and secular clergy, who had been independent until then, to adopt a rule of life and to be placed under the jurisdiction of the Dominican Order, by making a promise of obedience to the Master General of the Order. The laity were here being given an ecclesiastical mission and were being placed at the service of the preaching of truth "in accordance with their own life".

With this formal incorporation into the structure of the Dominican Order, the groups of Dominican penitents began to grow and flourish. With their legitimization through their Rule, they were able to withstand the accusations of the Franciscans, who might have felt some competition with their own Third Order.

This was a major development in the life of the Order, and was taken upon his initiative. Thus Munio played a significant role in the history of the Dominican Order. There were consequences, however. Upon the ascension to the Throne of St. Peter, the Franciscan friar, Pope Nicholas IV, took Munio's legislation as a reason to edit the Dominican Rule in its entirety.

=== Resignation ===
After Nicholas' election, rumors and stories about Munio's past started to circulate in Rome. Among them were the charges that he had been elected thanks, in large part, to the manipulations and bribery of his patron, King Sancho IV of Castile.

It was further alleged that Munio was also in the background when Sancho had authorized a payment of 30,000 maravedís to Cardinal Ordoño in 1285, just one month after Munio had been elevated to Master General. This was to cover the fact that Munio, dissolute and violent, made an earlier appearance in an affair involving a monastery of Dominican nuns in the small provincial city of his hometown of Zamora, which had occasioned a canonical visitation by the Bishop of Zamora in 1279. The community of Dominican nuns was split into factions, and the Dominican friars were behaving like characters from the Decameron. The resulting depositions survive, to form the basis of a highly readable history by Peter Linehan (1997) that lays open more than just the social history of Dominican friars and nuns in 13th-century Castile. Following Munio, his friends and his enemies, from Zamora to the papal court over a twenty-year period, Linehan shows how events in a Castilian monastery could influence high politics in the medieval Church.

Despite the shaky foundations of the rumors, in 1289 Pope Nicholas chose to believe them, and made a personal appeal to Munio that he resign his office. Munio did not act on this request. Then came the General Chapter of 1290, in which Munio was re-elected, despite the allegations. The capitulars in attendance declared that Munio's reputation for abstinence was so well-founded that the only infractions were of such a nature that it would have involved morsels "without which life was not worth living". Seeing this support, the pope offered Munio the position of Archbishop of Compostella, if he were to resign. Munio's response was that he would remove himself from office, if that was the Holy Father's will. Pope Nicholas demurred from taking such a responsibility.

The pope's indecision did not last long, however, for, the following year (1291), Pope Nicholas, with the support of the Archbishop of Genoa, Jacobus de Voragine (the author of the Golden Legend), ordered that Munio be removed from his office. Nicholas did so in a papal bull dated April 12, 1291, which he sent to the General Chapter for that year, which was being held in Palencia, Spain. The dismissal was not carried out, as King Sancho attacked the convoy of the papal messengers and seized the bull. Nevertheless, in 1292 the pope dramatically demanded that his command to the Order be implemented.

=== Bishopric and death ===
Munio's career was rehabilitated in 1294, when he was appointed Bishop of Palencia, thanks to the interventions of his protector, King Sancho. He had been in Palencia only two years, when, tired and disillusioned, he resigned his office and retired to the international motherhouse of the Order, the Monastery of Santa Sabina in Rome. It was there that he died on 19 February 1300. His body was entombed in the ancient Basilica of Santa Sabina.

Preceded by John of Vercelli	Master General of the Dominican Order; 1285–1291	Succeeded by Étienne de Besançon
Preceded by Juan Alfonso de Molina	Bishop of Palencia; 1294–1296	Succeeded by Álvaro Carrillo
