= Madonna of Chancellor Rolin =

Painting by Jan van Eyck

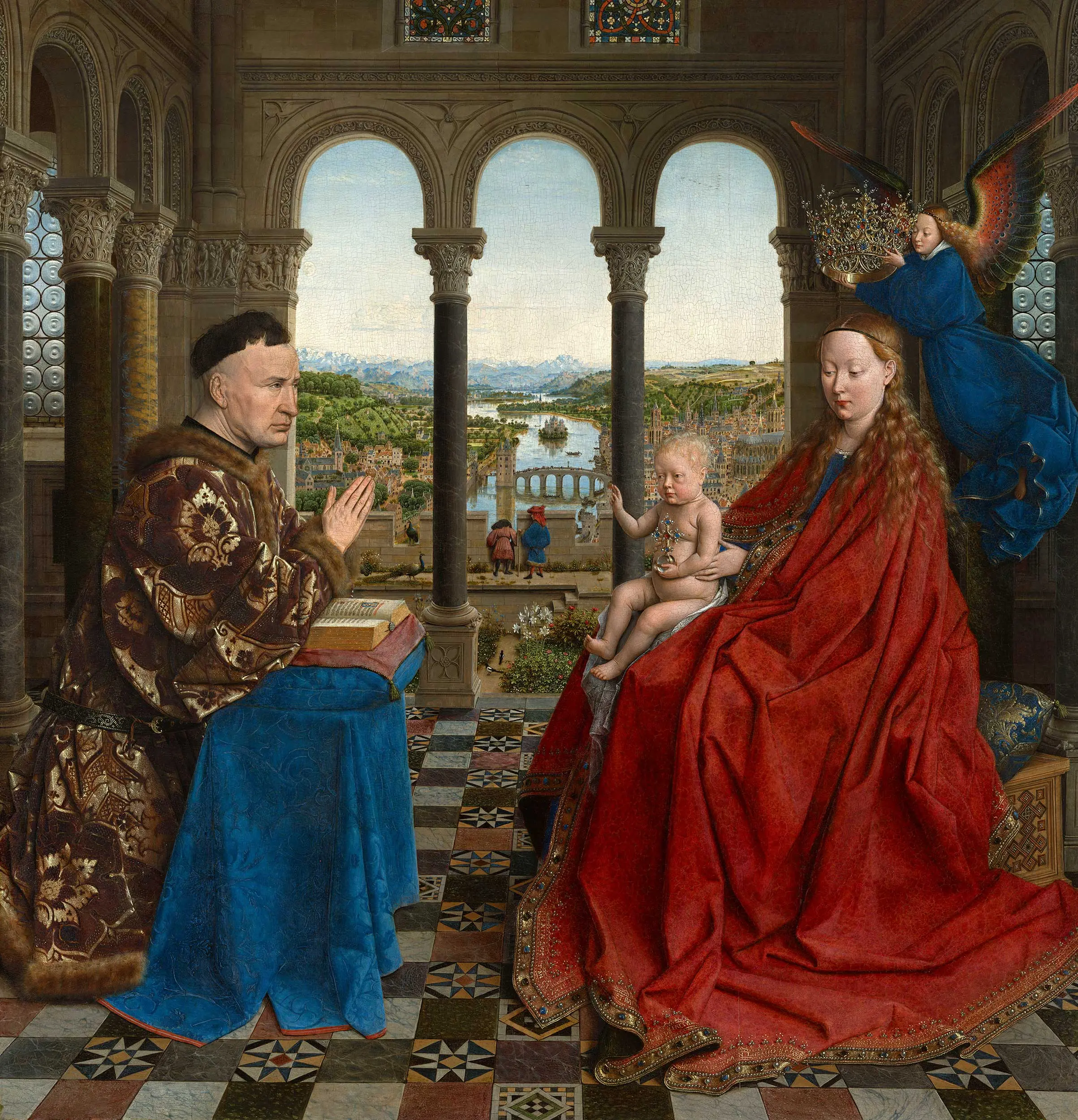
- Artist: Jan van Eyck
- Year: c. 1435
- Medium: Oil on panel
- Dimensions: 66 cm × 62 cm (26 in × 24 in)
- Location: Musée du Louvre, Paris

The Madonna of Chancellor Rolin is an oil painting by the Early Netherlandish painter Jan van Eyck, dating from around 1435. It is now in the Musée du Louvre, Paris. It was commissioned by Nicolas Rolin chancellor of the Duchy of Burgundy, then aged about 60, whose votive portrait takes up the left side of the picture, for his parish church, Notre-Dame-du-Chastel in Autun, where it remained until the church burnt down in 1793. After a period in Autun Cathedral, it was moved to the Louvre in 1805.

In 2024, following conservation, the painting was the focus of an exhibition at the Louvre.

== Description ==
The scene depicts the Virgin Mary crowned by a hovering angel while she presents the infant Jesus to Rolin. It is set within a spacious loggia with a rich decoration of columns and bas-reliefs. In the background is a landscape with a city on a river, probably intended to be Autun in Burgundy, Rolin's hometown. A wide range of well detailed palaces, churches, an island, a towered bridge, hills and fields is portrayed, subject to a uniform light. Perhaps some of the Chancellor's many landholdings around Autun are included in the vista. A haze covers a mountain range in the far distance. As in many Early Netherlandish paintings, the steepness of the hills and mountains is shown as much greater than that found locally, for dramatic effect.

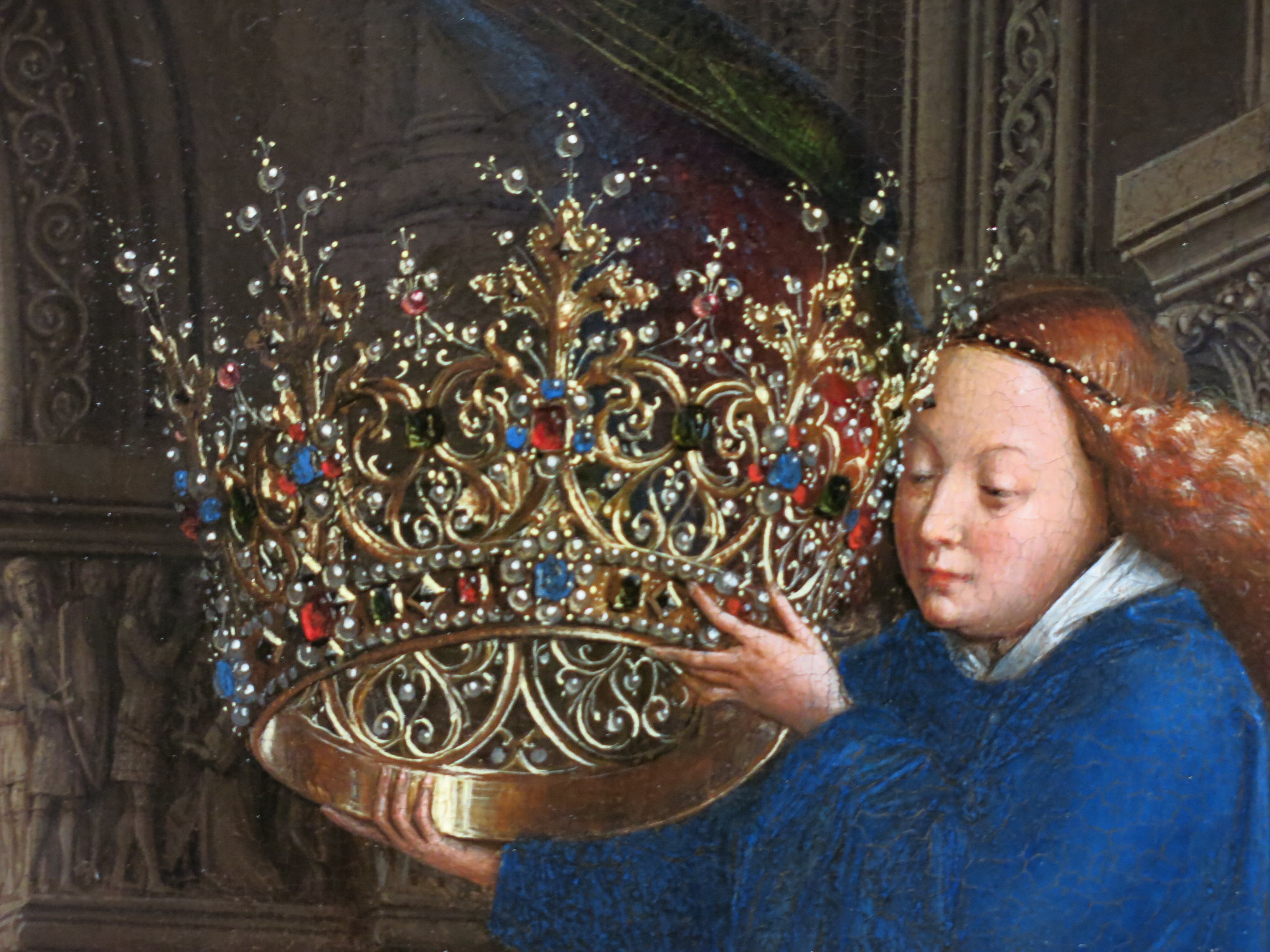
Detail of the angel

The small garden with many flowers identifiable (including lilies, irises, paeonies and roses), visible just outside the columns, symbolizes Mary's virtues. Beyond, two male figures wearing chaperons are looking through the crenellations of what looks to be a fortified balcony or bridge. There has been speculation that they may represent van Eyck and an assistant, after the pattern of his Arnolfini Portrait. The figure on the right wears a similar red chaperon to the probable van Eyck self-portrait in the National Gallery, London. Near to them are two magpies and two peacocks; the latter are symbols of immorality and of pride, to which even a powerful man as Rolin might succumb. However Martí Domínguez states – Peacocks were the symbol of Jesus Christ and magpies were regarded as evil. Artists like to oppose the symbolic birds, the dichotomy between good and evil: Van Eyck, in the panel of the Chancellor Rolin, will also use the peacock and the magpie.

The interior has complex light sources, typical of van Eyck, with light coming both from the central portico and the side windows. The chancellor, whose strong character is well rendered by the artist, is wearing a fur-lined, elegant garment; the Virgin, the same size as Rolin (rather a novelty in comparison to the Gothic painting tradition), is instead covered by a red mantle. The Infant Jesus holds a globus cruciger (cross-bearing orb) in his left hand, with his right hand raised in the gesture of a blessing. The perfectionist rendering of details and textures, such as the capitals, the checquered pavement, the goldwork of the angel's crown or the garments is characteristic of Jan van Eyck's work, of which this is one of the finest examples.

As in other van Eycks, the depiction of the space is not as straightforward as it first appears. Comparison of the floor-tiles with other elements shows that the figures are only about six feet from the columned loggia screen, and that Rolin might have to squeeze himself through the opening to get out that way. Many van Eycks show an interior space that is actually very small, but the depiction is subtly managed to retain a sense of intimacy, but without feeling constricted.

== Alterations ==
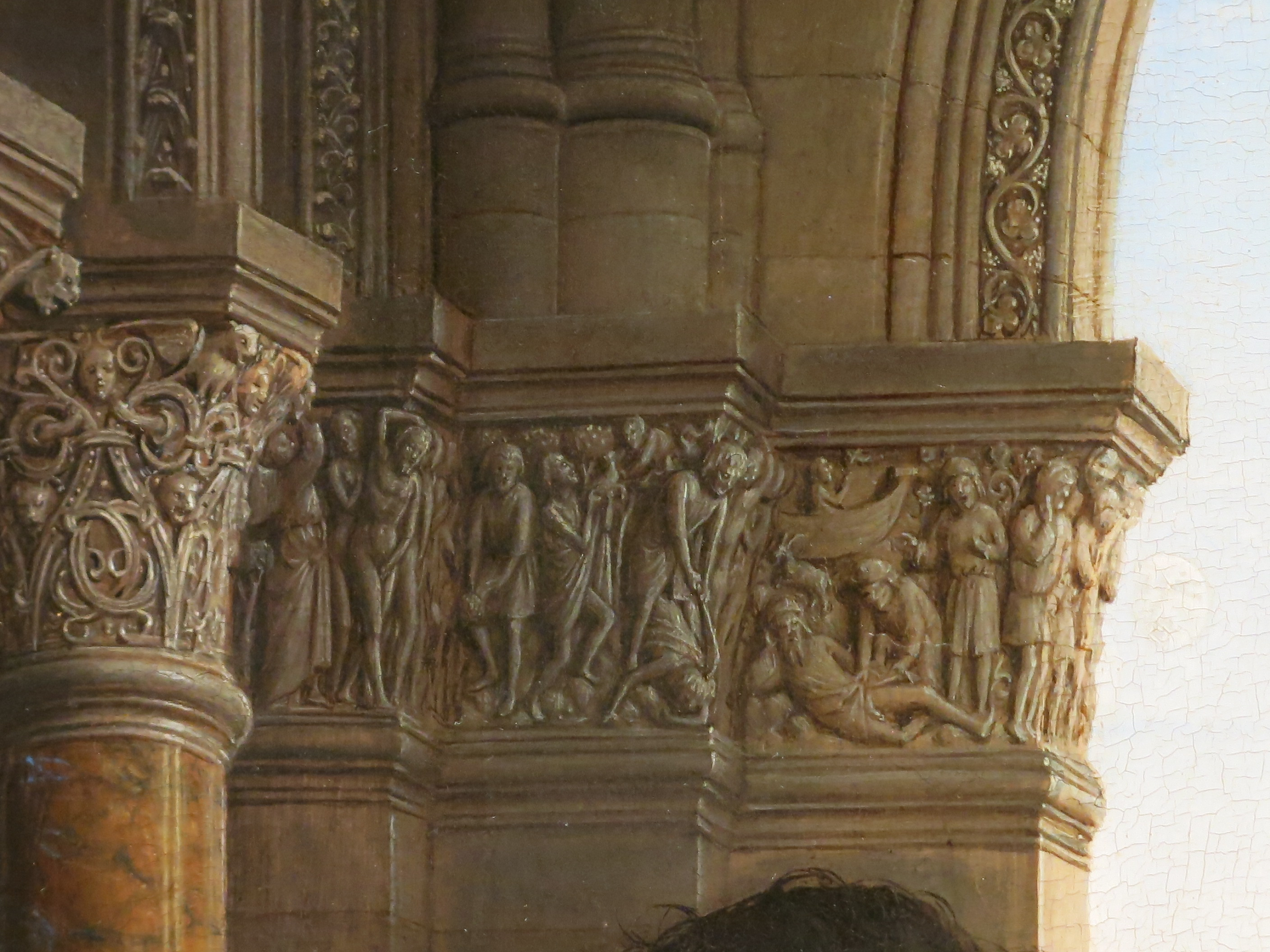
Carvings above Rolin

Infrared reflectograms have disclosed a number of changes from the underdrawing. Rolin had a large purse hanging from his belt; since he had grown very rich in public office he probably felt that would be inappropriate. The infant Christ was originally pointing at the floor. Old descriptions from Autun tell us that the painting originally had a wooden frame painted illusionistically with inscriptions seemingly carved, like van Eyck's two portraits in London (Léal Souvenir and Portrait of a Man in a Turban).

== Iconography ==
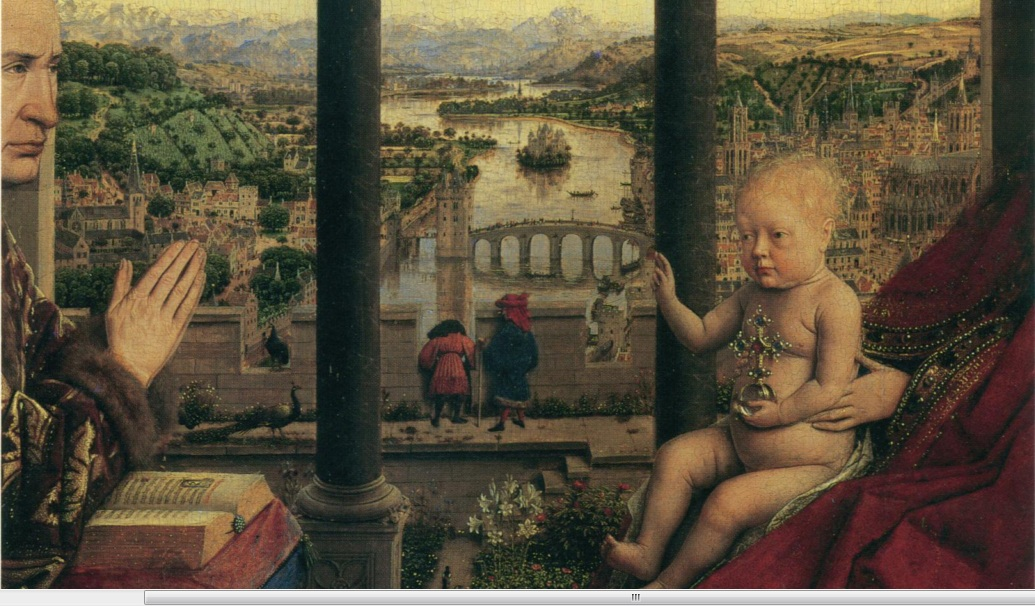
Detail showing the church over Rolin's hands, and the cathedral over Christ, the flowers in the garden and the squashed rabbits of lust

The Virgin sits with the infant Christ "on her knee" (i.e. on her thighs), which make a platform for the infant. This very traditional motif is known as the Throne of Wisdom, and was often used by Jan van Eyck, who elaborated the meaning in complex allusions. The Virgin's body was often compared to an altar, on which Christ was present as he was believed to be during the Mass. This painting may have originally hung to the left of Rolin's place at the front of his chapel in his parish church, between him and the altar. To Rolin, or a viewer of the real and painted Rolins together, the Virgin is painted in the position of the altar in the chapel. The illuminated manuscript in front of Rolin is open to a page with a large initial D, which probably indicates "Domine, labia mea aperies" ("Lord, open my lips"), the opening of Matins; this is therefore a Book of Hours.

The architecture of the loggia, as in so many of van Eyck's paintings, is in a rich and delicate Romanesque style far from the Gothic styles of his own day. The setting probably represents at the same time an imaginary building in Autun, and the "Heavenly city of Jerusalem"; two personages from two worlds are shown, and their surrounding combines the world of each.

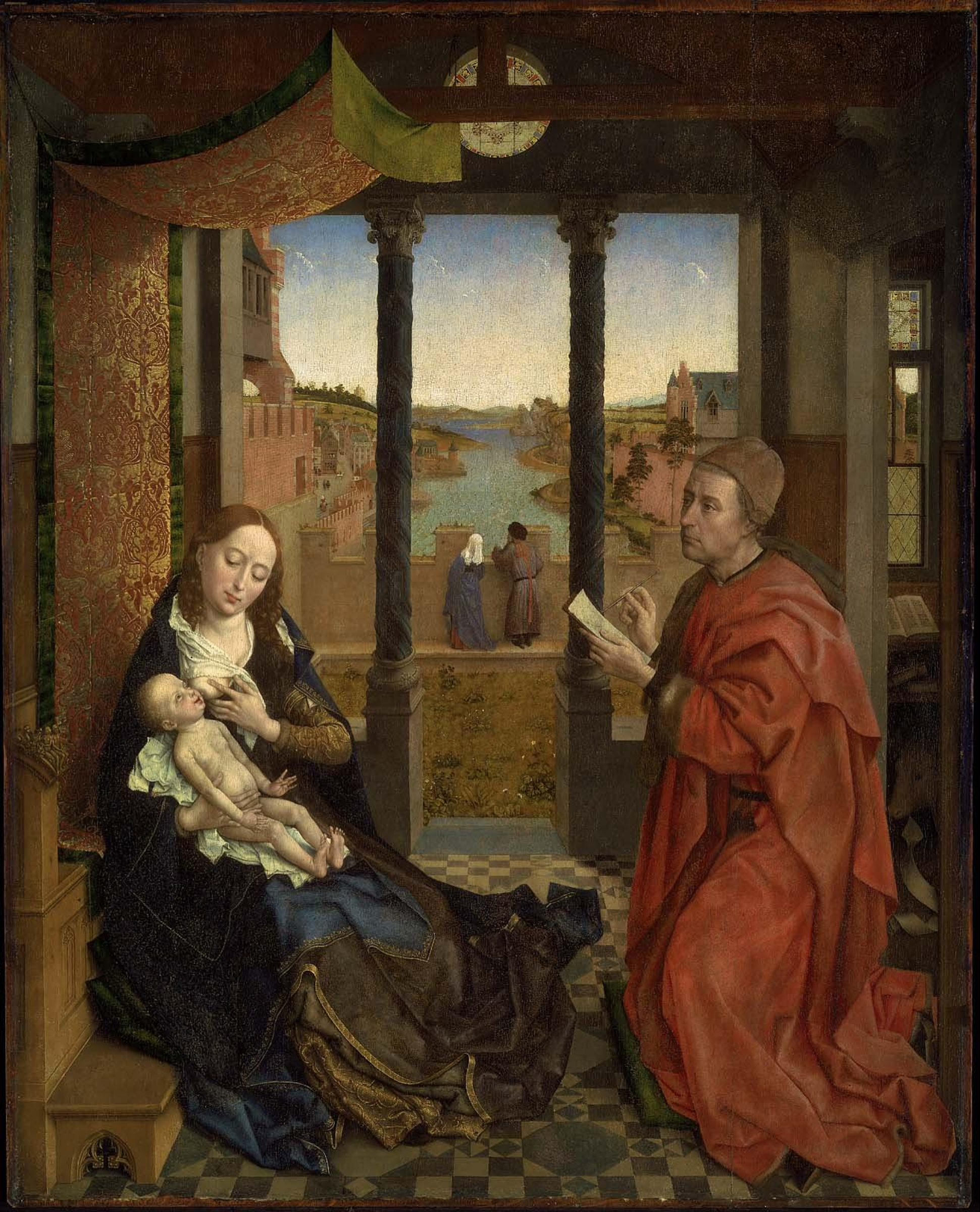
Rogier van der Weyden, Saint Luke Drawing the Virgin c. 1440. Saint Luke makes a drawing for his painting of the Virgin. The setting is clearly derived from the Rolin Madonna.

The painting might be connected with the appointment in 1436 of Rolin's son Jean as Bishop of Autun; there is a magnificent cathedral on the Virgin's side of the river. Also, just above Rolin's hands there is a smaller church, perhaps intended to represent a new church dedicated to the Virgin, or his own parish church, Notre-Dame-du-Chastel which he greatly enriched.

There appears to be a series of illustrations of the Seven deadly sins distributed among the details of the painting. The reliefs just over Rolin's head show (from left) the expulsion of Adam and Eve from Paradise (Pride), the Killing of Abel by Cain (Envy) and the Drunkenness of Noah (Gluttony). Then the lion-heads on the capitals behind Rolin may stand for Anger, and the tiny squashed rabbits between column and base in the loggia screen for Lust (which they were considered to exemplify in the Middle Ages). All these details are on Rolin's side of the painting; no equivalents are visible on the other, divine, side. However this leaves Avarice and Sloth unaccounted for, unless perhaps the human figures of Rolin himself (with his underdrawn purse), and the idlers out on the terrace (perhaps including, as stated above, van Eyck himself) represent the last two vices.

== See also ==
- 100 Great Paintings, 1980 BBC series
- List of works by Jan van Eyck
