= The Justice of Trajan and Herkinbald =

Set of lost paintings by Rogier van der Weyden

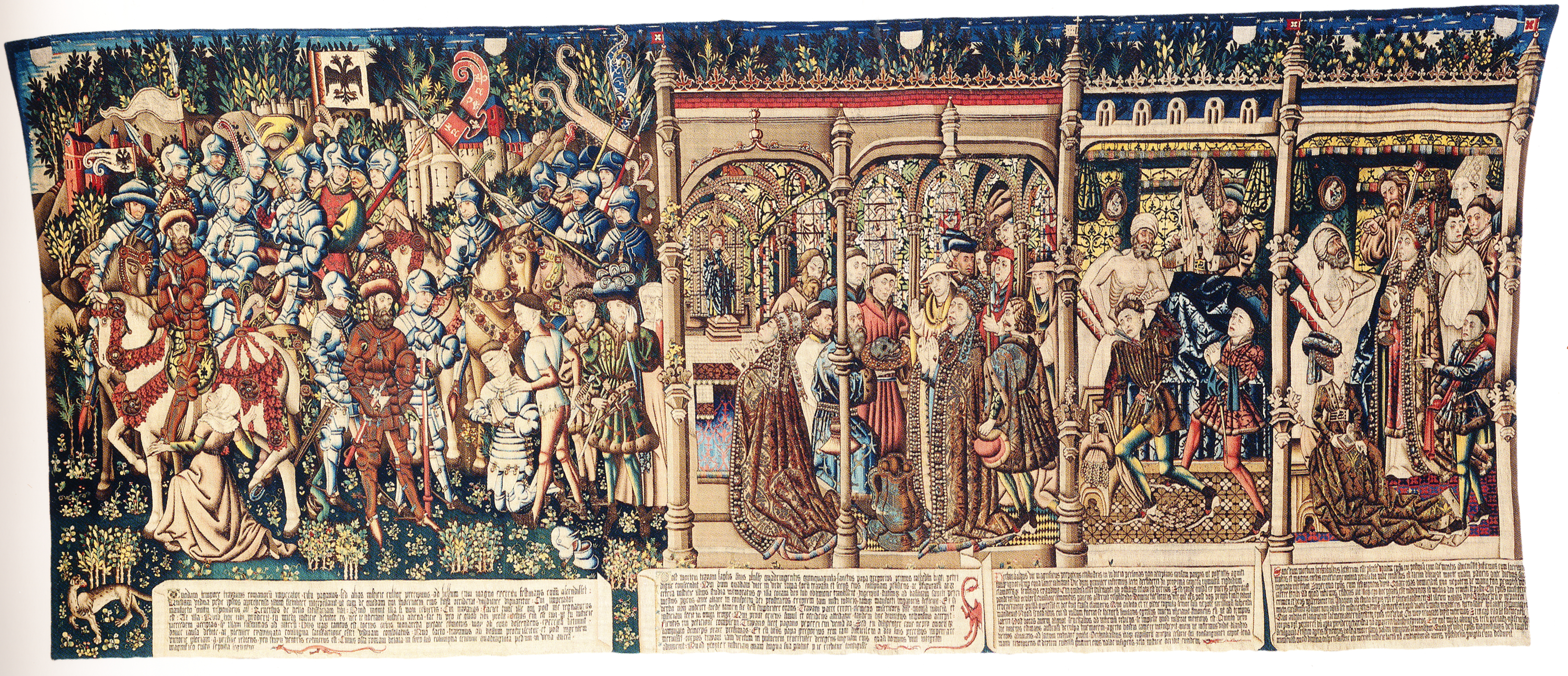
A free copy in tapestry of The Justice of Trajan and Herkinbald now in the Historical Museum of Bern.

The Justice of Trajan and Herkinbald was a set of four large panels painted by the Early Netherlandish painter Rogier van der Weyden that decorated one wall of a court-room in the Town Hall of Brussels. They represented the Justice of Trajan, a Roman emperor, and the Justice of Herkinbald, a legendary Duke of Brabant. The panels were intended as a reminder to judges to dispense impartial justice and were admired by generations of visitors, including Albrecht Dürer.

They were destroyed when the city was bombarded by the French in 1695 and are now known only from descriptions and from a tapestry copy in the Historical Museum of Bern.

The work is thought to have preoccupied van der Weyden for several years, and is believed to have been, in conception and execution, on a scale and breadth and skill to equal Jan van Eyck's Ghent Altarpiece. The panels were recorded and described in a number of sources until the 17th century; especially detailed are the inscriptions on the frames, which are likely the same as those contained on the edges of the tapestry.

== Description ==
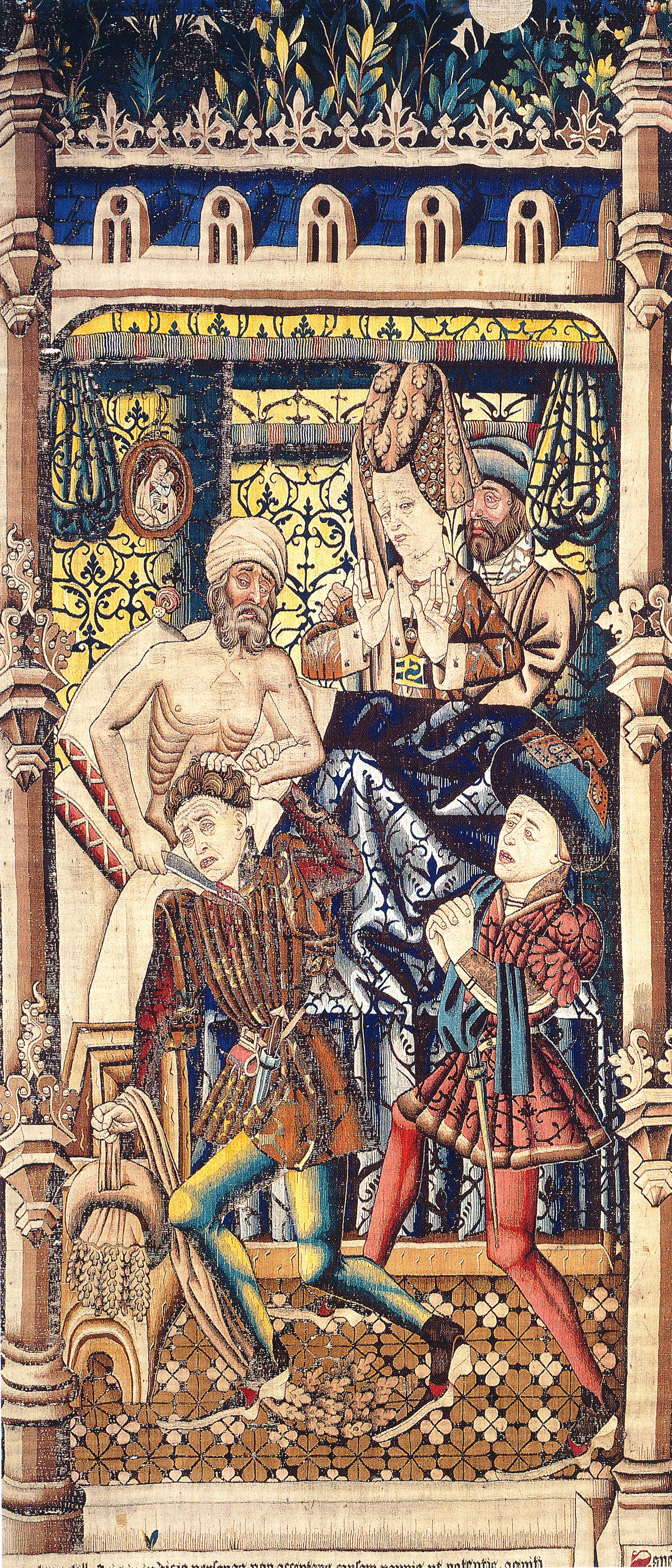
A detail from The Justice of Trajan and Herkinbald tapestry showing Herkinbald slaying his nephew as a punishment for rape.

Each panel was about eleven feet in height, and together they spanned a distance of about thirty-five feet. The theme of the panels was justice safeguarded by divine intervention. The legends of Trajan and Herkinbald appear to occur together for the first time in 1308 in the Alphabetum Narrationum (Alphabet of Tales), a collection of over 800 tales attributed to Arnold of Liége (previously to Etienne de Besançon) arranged by themes and intended to be used as a basis for homilies. The theme Iustitia (Justice) included just these two legends, although the legend of Trajan is given in a slightly different version from that depicted in the paintings and tapestry.

The first panel shows a widow begging justice from Trajan for the murder of her son, Trajan ordering the execution of the soldier accused by the woman (in the tale in the Alphabetum Narrationum, he offered the widow his own son as a replacement for her murdered son). The second panel depicts the story in the Golden Legend of Pope Gregory I's miraculous resurrection and conversion of Trajan, thus releasing him from Purgatory.

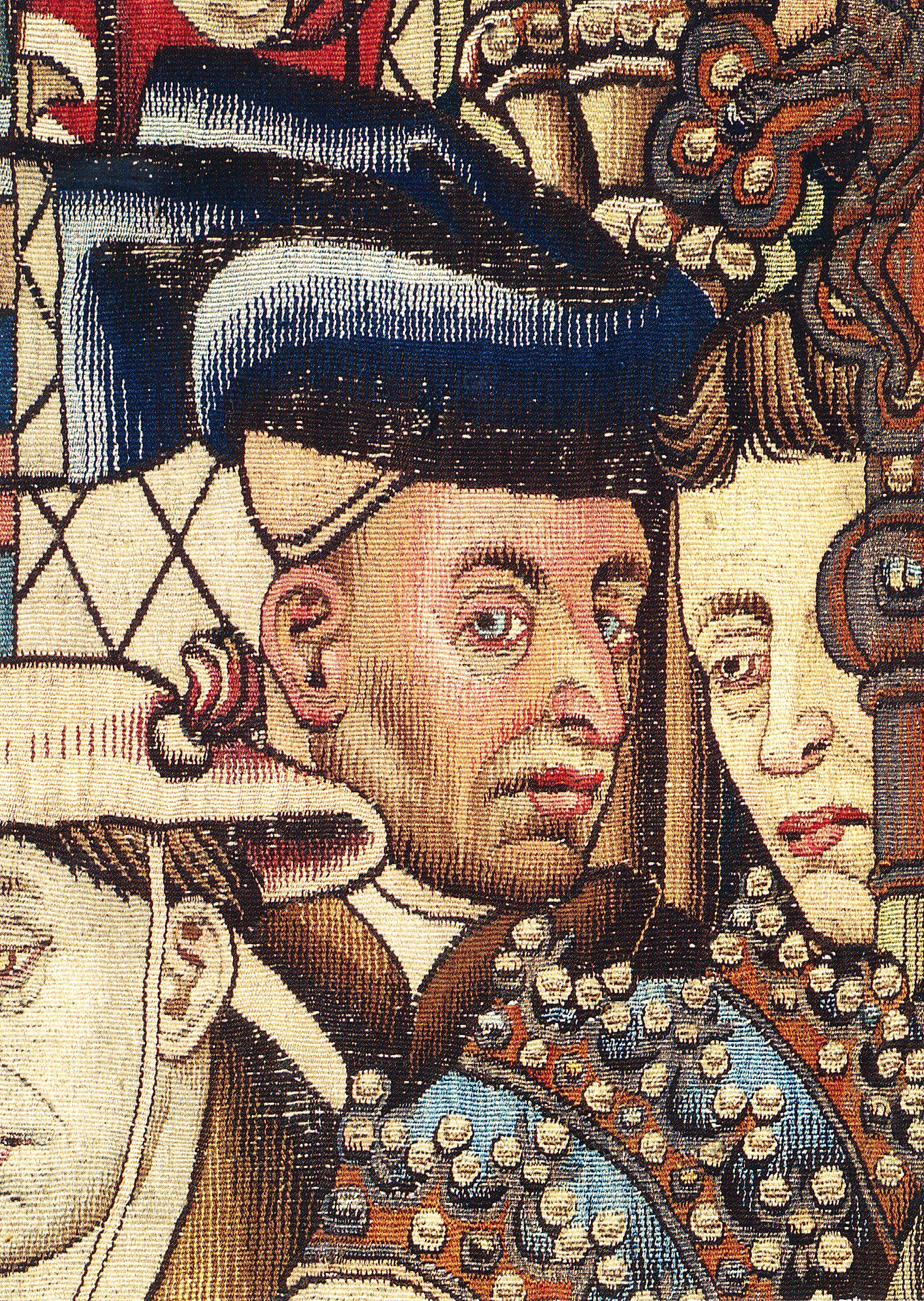
Detail believed to be a self-portrait

Gregory is shown holding Trajan's exhumed skull, in which the tongue has been miraculously preserved and thus able to utter the death sentence, demonstrating the justness of that sentence. Van der Weyden is known to have portrayed himself as a bystander in this scene. The third panel depicted Herkinbald on his deathbed slitting the throat of his nephew, who had committed a rape. The fourth panel showed Herkinbald miraculously receiving the Host, despite refusing to confess the slaying of his nephew as a sinful act.

Both Nicholas of Cusa (in 1453) and Dubuisson-Aubenay (in the 1620s) mentioned that the work contained a self-portrait, generally thought to be faithfully reproduced in the 'Herkinbald slaying his nephew' passage.

== Tapestry ==
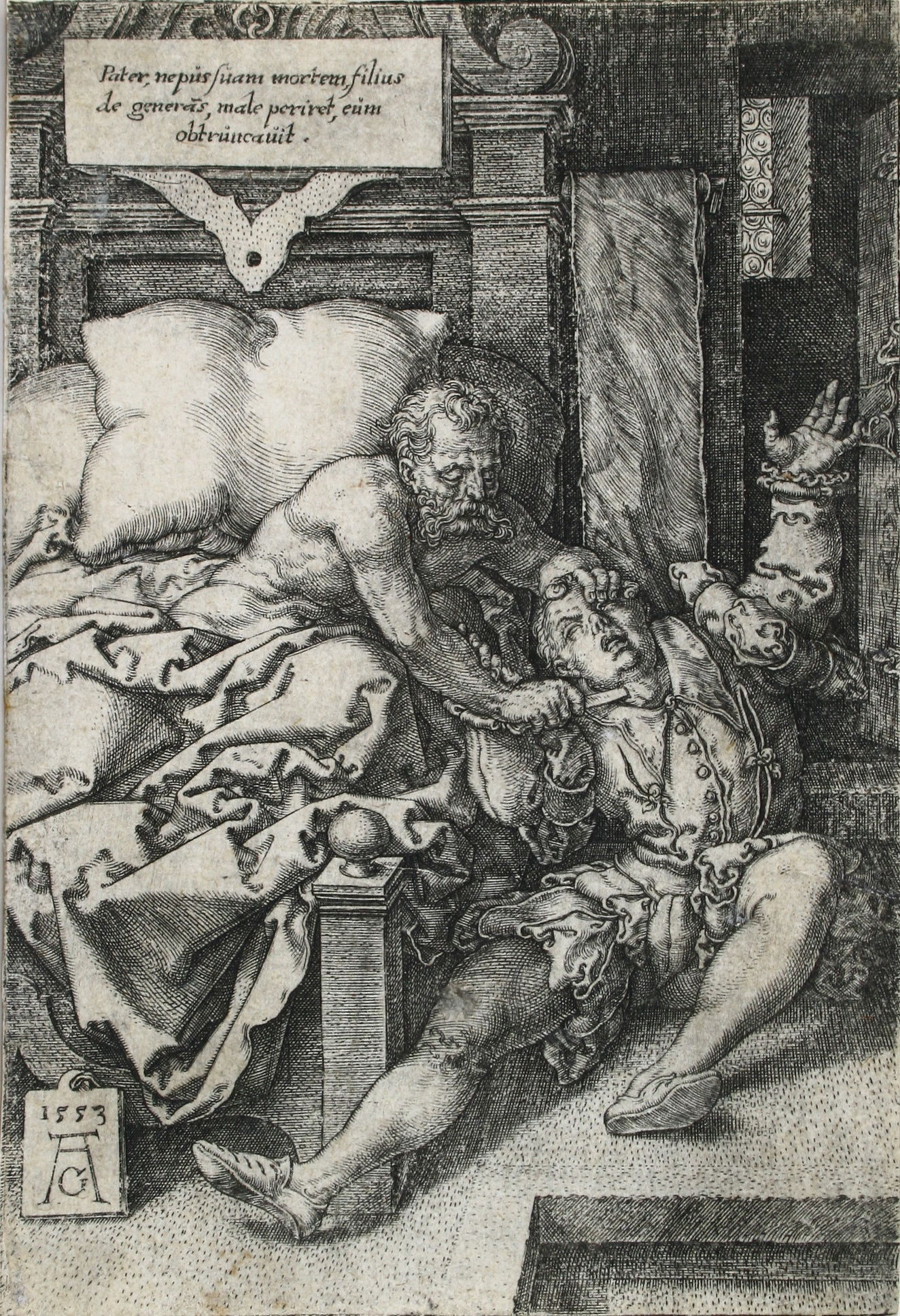
Heinrich Aldegrever, one of the Little Masters following Albrecht Dürer, depicting Herkinbald on his deathbed slaying his nephew guilty of rape.

The tapestry dates from about 1450. It measures 461 cm by 1053 cm (about 15 feet by 35 feet) and was probably woven in either Tournai or Brussels, two important centres of tapestry manufacture and both associated with van der Weyden. It is a wall tapestry, woven in wool, silk, and gold and silver thread.

It was commissioned by George of Saluzzo on his appointment as Bishop of Lausanne in 1440. Saluzzo wanted a tapestry depicting scenes of justice for the courtroom above his chapter house. He apparently knew that van der Weyden had painted these scenes and ordered them copied. It was not an exact copy, but the earliest surviving work which depicts the scenes.

In the passages depicting Pope Gregory I, one of the bystanders is more finely and carefully worked than the others, and this is almost certainly a copy of the self-portrait that van der Weyden had originally incorporated in his painting. It is one of only two self-portraits that survive, both as copies (of which the other has two versions), of van der Weyden. Campbell remarks it gives a better impression of van der Weyden's disdainful appearance than the other.

== See also ==
- List of works by Rogier van der Weyden

== Sources ==
- Banks, Mary Macleod, ed., Alphabet of Tales: An English 15th Century Translation of the Alphabetum Narrationum of Etienne de Besançon (Early English Text Society Original Series 126, 127,1904, 1905 [Rpt. 200]). OCLC 781113
- Campbell, Lorne. Van der Weyden. London: Chaucer Press, 2004. ISBN 1-904449-24-7
- Campbell, Lorne & Van der Stock, Jan. Rogier van der Weyden: 1400–1464. Master of Passions. Davidsfonds, Leuven, 2009. ISBN 978-90-8526-105-6
- Campbell, Lorne. Van der Weyden. London: Chaucer Press, 2004. ISBN 1-904449-24-7
- Rothstein, Bret. Looking the part: ruminative viewing and the imagination of community in the early modern Low Countries, Art History, 31:1, February 2008, pp. 1–32
- Stechow, Wolfgang. Northern Renaissance Art, 1400-1600: Sources and Documents, p. 9, at Google Books
