= Helmut Ruhemann =

German painting conservator

Helmut Ruhemann CBE
- Born: 1891; Berlin, Germany
- Died: 1973 (aged 81–82)
- Occupations: Painting conservator and restorer

Helmut Ruhemann CBE, (1891–1973) was a German painting conservator and restorer, considered the pre-eminent of his profession during his lifetime.

== Early life and education ==
He was born in Berlin and studied at Karlsruhe, Munich and Paris.

== Career ==
He was instrumental both in the promotion and utilisation of x-rays as an art historical tool and was progressive in his efforts to clean old master paintings in a faithful manner that did not impede on original brushstrokes or outlines. He contributed to the progression of both art history and conservation through his making available his detailed notes and photographs.

One of his most celebrated restorations is that of Rogier van der Weyden's Saint Luke Drawing the Virgin, a task he undertook with extreme caution, as it pitted him against Max J. Friedlander, whom he faced down in his approach but who, in the end, was complimentary towards him.

He left Germany for England in 1933, following a depreciating political climate in the Third Reich which led to his being sacked from his post at the Kaiser-Friedrich-Museum because he was Jewish. He worked as Art Restorer for the National Gallery, London from 1934, and spent part of the war in Wales and at the Tate Gallery from 1939. Ruhemann is especially noted for the copious notes, detailed letters exchanged with other art historians and the many photographs he kept of his restorative undertakings, all of which greatly broaden our understanding of art historical thinking in the early to mid-20th century.

His workshop in Golden Square, Soho is the site of the first London Stolperstein stone, marking the workplace of Holocaust victim Ada von Dantzig who studied restoration with Ruhemann.

== Sources ==
- Hand, John Oliver; Metzger, Catherine; Spronk, Ron. Prayers and Portraits: Unfolding the Netherlandish Diptych. National Gallery of Art, Koninklijk Museum voor Schone Kunsten (Belgium), 2006. Connecticut: Yale University Press. ISBN 978-0-300-12155-1
