= Stephen of Besançon =

Stephen of Besançon, O.P., (ca. 1250, Free Imperial City of Besançon—22 November 1294, Republic of Lucca) was a French Dominican friar, who served briefly as the Master General of the Order.

Stephen began his studies in 1273 and graduated as Baccalaureus biblicus (Bachelor of Theology in Biblical Studies) in 1286. Two years later he obtained his Master's degree (Magister) from the Faculty of Theology of the University of Paris. A popular collection of sermons entitled Alphabetum narrationum was once thought to be attributable to him, but later research has shown that it was by Arnoldus Leodiensis.

First as Prior Provincial of northern France (1291) and then as Master General of the Order of Preachers (in 1292) he tried to lead the Order back to the original severity of its ideal. He died in Lucca in Tuscany, while on the way back to Rome from a journey of canonical visitations of the priories of the Order.

Preceded by Munio of Zamora	Master General of the Dominican Order; 1292–1294	Succeeded by Niccolò Boccasini
