= Arnoldus Leodiensis =

Arnoldus Leodiensis (Arnold de Liège, Arnold of Liège, born around 1276; died around 1309), was a monk of the Dominican Order and a Latin author who is believed to have lived in the vicinity of Liège, then a city of the Episcopal Principality of Liège, in present-day Belgium.

== Biography ==
Arnoldus is known from his Alphabetum narrationum (formerly attributed to Stephen of Besançon): the initials of the sentences of its prologue form the acrostic "Arnuldus de Serain", Seraing being a commune near Liège. This way of encoding intellectual responsibility was well established in medieval tradition, and Arnoldus's identity as author was established through the late nineteenth- and early twentieth-century work of Barthélemy Hauréau and John Alexander Herbert.

== Works ==
Arnoldus created the Alphabetum narrationum (Alphabet of Narratives), a working tool for preachers composed between 1297 and 1308. The text listed exempla (stories that preachers might wish to use in their sermons), giving each story a number of thematic keywords and listing them alphabetically with a sophisticated system of cross-references.

A fourteenth-century copy of the Alphabetum narrationum is held in the collection of the Royal Library of Belgium, Manuscripts Department, under the reference number KBR ms. IV 14.

The work was translated into a number of European languages, including English.

=== Editions ===
- Arnold de Liège; Ribaucourt, Colette; Brilli, Elisa; Berlioz, Jacques; Polo de Beaulieu, Marie-Anne (2015). Arnoldi Leodiensis "Alphabetum narrationum". Exempla Medii Aevi. Turnhout: Brepols. ISBN 978-2-503-53200-4. (which should be read alongside Brilli, Elisa (2019). "Retour sur l'Alphabetum narrationum d'Arnold de Liège". The Journal of Medieval Latin. 29: 163–198. ISSN 0778-9750.)
- BANKS, Mary Macleod (1904). An Alphabet of Tales: an English 15th Century Translation of the Alphabetum Narrationum of Etienne de Besançon, from Additional MS. 25719 of the British Museum. for the Early English Text Society by Kegan Paul, Trench & Trubner.
