= St. Donatian's Cathedral =

Roman Catholic cathedral in Bruges, Belgium

Coordinates: 51°12′33″N 3°13′38″E

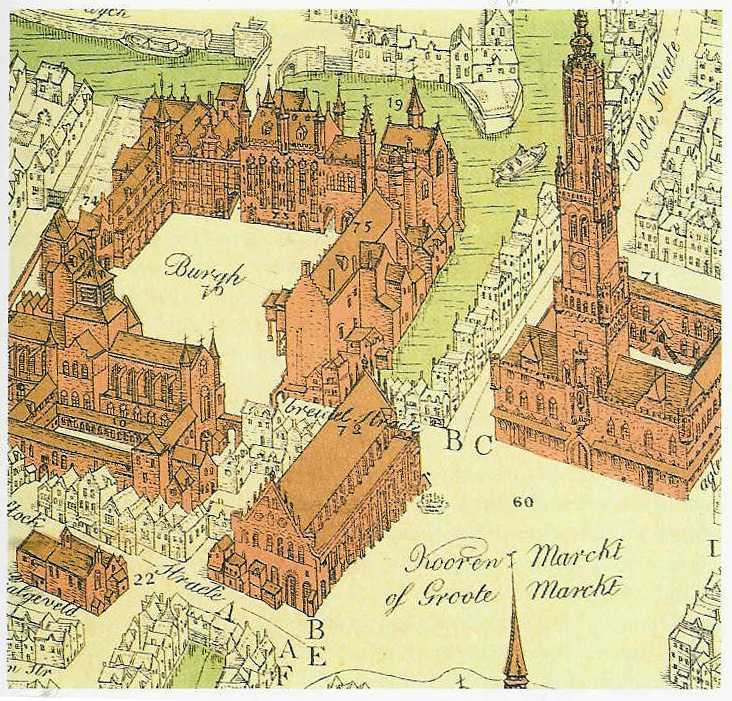
St. Donatian's Church (left) on the map of Marcus Gerards (1562)

St. Donatian's Cathedral (Dutch: Sint-Donaaskathedraal) was a Roman Catholic cathedral in Bruges, Belgium. Located on the Burg, one of the main squares in the city, it was the largest church in Bruges.

The cathedral was destroyed in 1799 in the wake of the dissolution of the Diocese of Bruges during the aftermath of the French Revolution.

== History ==
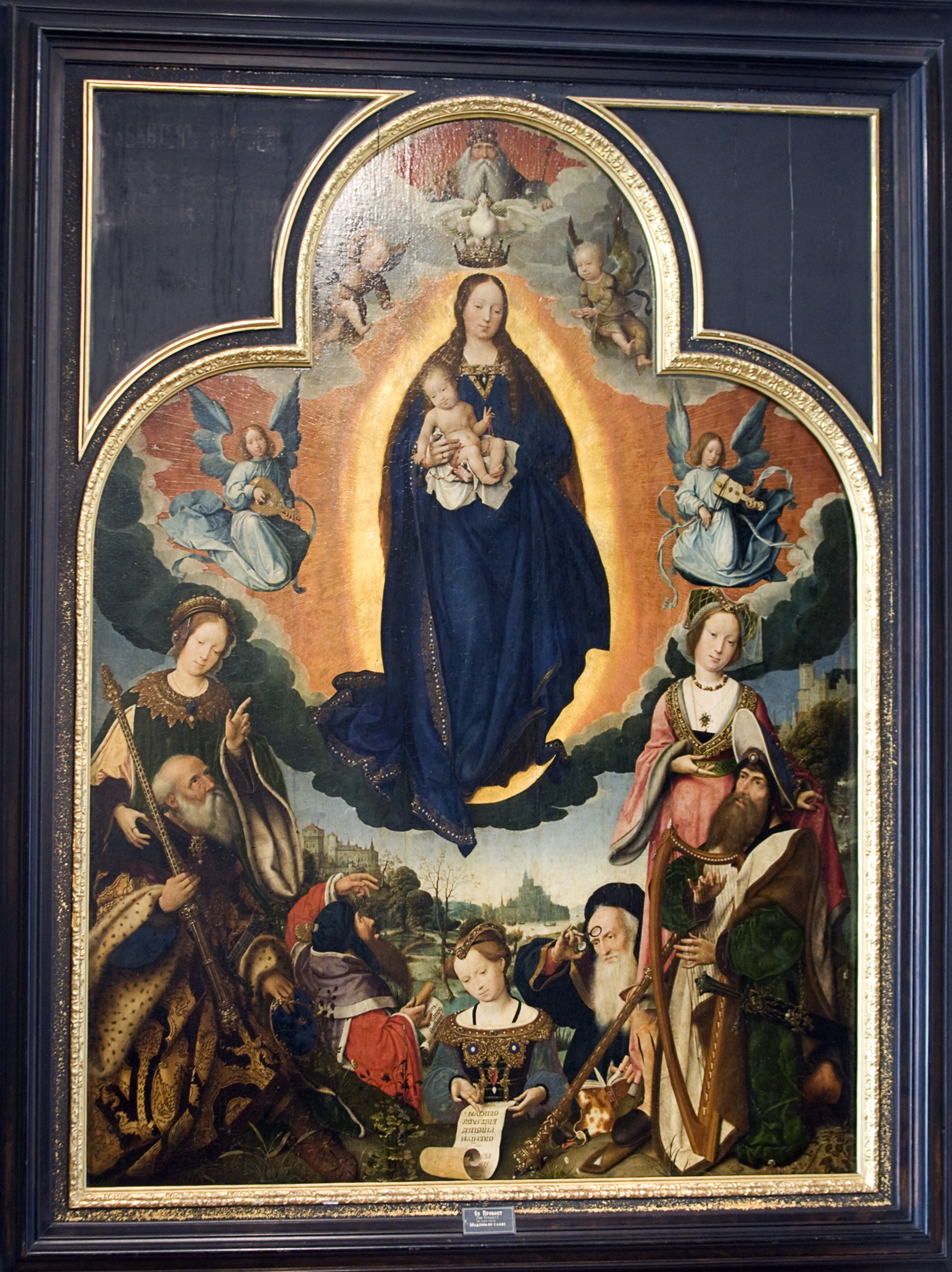
Jan Provoost. Mary in glory. (Hermitage, Russia)

St. Donatian's Church (Dutch: Sint-Donaaskerk) was built by Arnulf I, Count of Flanders, c. 950 AD, in order to house the relics of Saint Donatian that had been brought to Bruges in c. 870 AD by monks from Torhout. On 2 March 1127, Charles the Good, Count of Flanders was assassinated in St. Donatian's.

The church was built in the Romanesque architectural style. There was an octagonal main building, with a tower and a sixteen-sided ambulatory. The building stood on the Burg square, across from the Stadhuis (city hall). St. Donatian's Church became a cathedral following the installation of the first Bishop of Bruges in 1562. (Note: The Bishopric of Bruges was created in 1559 (McDonald, p.15, 26), but the position was not filled until 1562 (McDonald, p.26).)

St. Donatian's was destroyed in 1799 by occupying forces of the French First Republic. The former site of St. Donatian's is now occupied by the Crowne Plaza Brugge Hotel; the foundations of the cathedral were uncovered in 1955 and are visible in the hotel's cellars.

== Artworks ==
- Jan van Eyck's painting The Virgin and Child with Canon van der Paele (1436), which also depicts St. Donatian, was commissioned by Canon Joris van der Paele as an altarpiece for the church. (Note: The painting is now housed in the Groeningemuseum in Bruges (Dunford and Lee, p.177; McDonald, p.97-98).) Jan van Eyck himself was buried in St. Donatian's Church in 1441.
- Jan Provoost's altarpiece "Mary in Glory" (1524) also was made for this church. It was hidden during Reformation and found in the walls during demolition of building. Later, the painting was in king Willem II's collection, and after his death was bought for the Hermitage.

== Sources ==
- Davis, R.H.C. (1990). King Stephen, Third Edition. London and New York: Longman. ISBN 0-582-04000-0
- Dunford, M. and Lee, P. (2002). The Rough Guide to Belgium and Luxembourg, Third Edition. London and New York: Rough Guides Ltd. ISBN 1-85828-871-1
- McDonald, G. (2002). Insight Compact Guide: Bruges, Second Edition. Singapore: APA Publications. ISBN 981-234-705-4
