= The Just Judges =

Stolen panel of van Eyck's Ghent Altarpiece

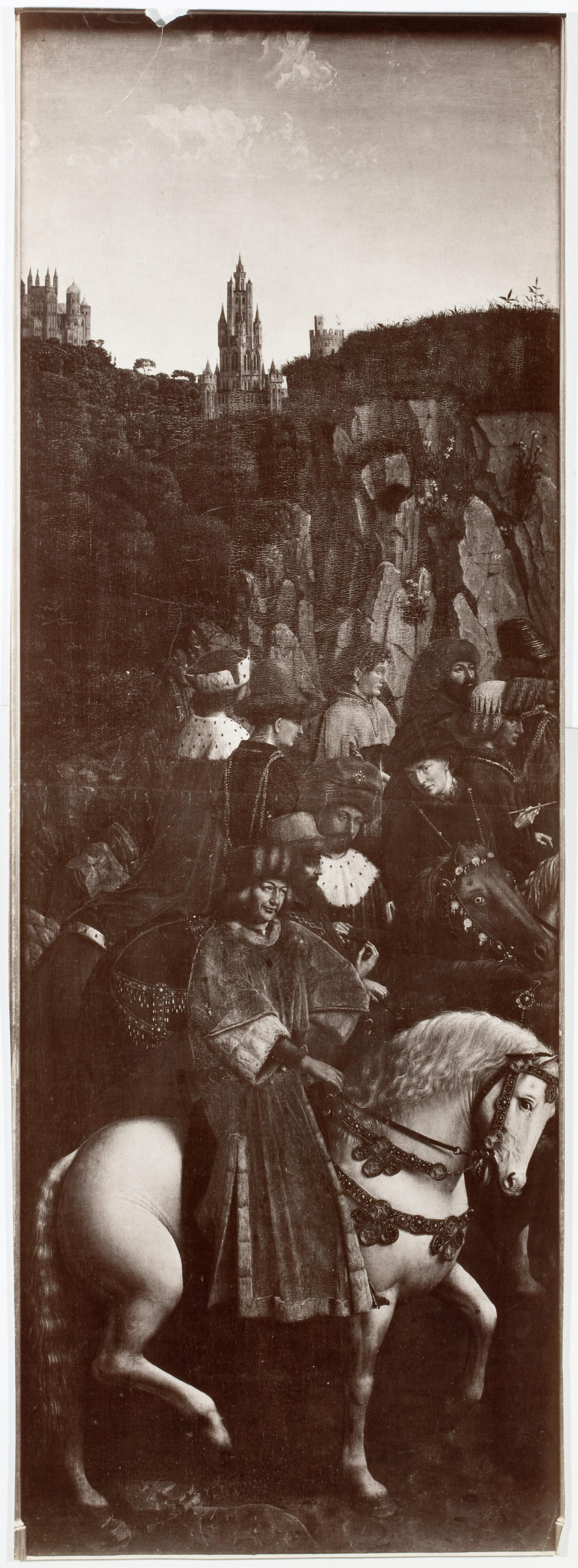
Photograph of the original Just Judges panel, now missing

The Just Judges, also called The Righteous Judges, is the lower left panel of the Ghent Altarpiece, painted by Jan van Eyck or his brother Hubert Van Eyck between 1430 and 1432. It is believed that the panel shows portraits of several contemporary figures such as Philip the Good, and possibly the artists Hubert and Jan van Eyck themselves. The panel was stolen in 1934 and has never been found.

== Theft ==
The panel was displayed at the Saint Bavo Cathedral in Ghent, Belgium, together with the rest of the Ghent Altarpiece, until it was stolen during the night of 10 April 1934, possibly by the Belgian Arsène Goedertier (Lede, 23 December 1876 – Dendermonde, 25 November 1934). The day after the theft, the commissioner of the Ghent police, Antoine Luysterborghs, was briefly present at the crime scene before leaving to investigate a theft at a nearby cheese shop.

The panel was removed from the frame, apparently with care, leaving the other panels undamaged. In the empty space was left a note, written in French, with the words, "Taken from Germany by the Treaty of Versailles", a reference to the fact that the altarpiece, having been removed to Berlin by German forces during World War I, had to be returned in accordance with Article 247 of the Treaty of Versailles. On 30 April, the Bishop of Ghent received a ransom demand for one million Belgian francs, to which the Belgian minister refused to agree. A second letter was delivered in May. The Belgian government then commenced negotiations with the thief arguing that since the lost panel was a national treasure, the diocese's ownership interest was subordinate to that of the nation. Correspondence continued through October between the thief and the government, with the exchange of at least 11 letters. In an act of good faith, the ransomer returned one of the panel's two parts (a grisaille painting of St John the Baptist).

On 25 November 1934 the self-proclaimed thief, Arsène Goedertier, revealed on his deathbed to his lawyer that he was the only one who knew where the masterpiece was hidden, and that he would take the secret to his grave. Goedertier told his lawyer, Georges de Vos, that "I alone know where the Mystic Lamb is. The information is in the drawer on the right of my writing table, in an envelope marked 'mutualité.'" De Vos found carbon copies of the ransom notes, and an unsent note that said "[it] rests in a place where neither I, nor anybody else, can take it away without arousing the attention of the public." De Vos only told the police of Goedertier's confession a month later. The police concluded that Goedertier had been the thief.

There is speculation that the presumed thief, Goedertier, could not have acted alone and that he must have had inside help possibly from one of the four custodians of the cathedral. Several people have claimed to know its whereabouts and extensive searches have been held to locate it including an X-ray of the whole cathedral to a depth of 10 metres (33 ft). The panel has never been recovered and is now believed to have been destroyed. To this day, a Ghent police detective remains assigned to the case of the missing panel.

== Replacement copy ==
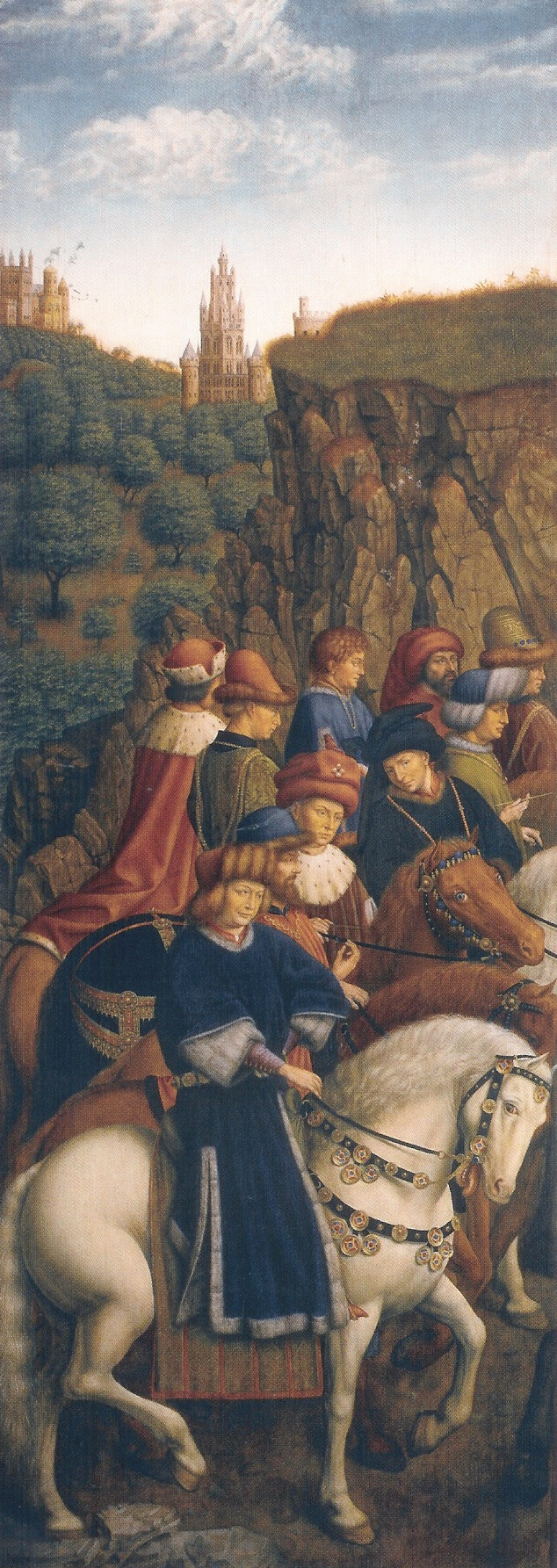
Copy of the Just Judges (145 × 51 cm) by Jef Van der Veken

The panel was replaced in 1945 by a copy made by Belgian restorer and copyist Jef Van der Veken. Van der Veken used a two-centuries old closet shelf for the panel. His reference was another copy Michiel Coxie had produced in the mid-16th century for Philip II of Spain, and kept at the Royal Museums of Fine Arts of Belgium. In order to harmonize his copy with the appearance of other panels of the Ghent Altarpiece, Van der Veken applied a layer of wax to create a similar patina. He subtly indicated his work was a copy by giving one of the horsemen the facial features of Leopold III, who was the reigning King of the Belgians at the time the panel was stolen and the copy made.

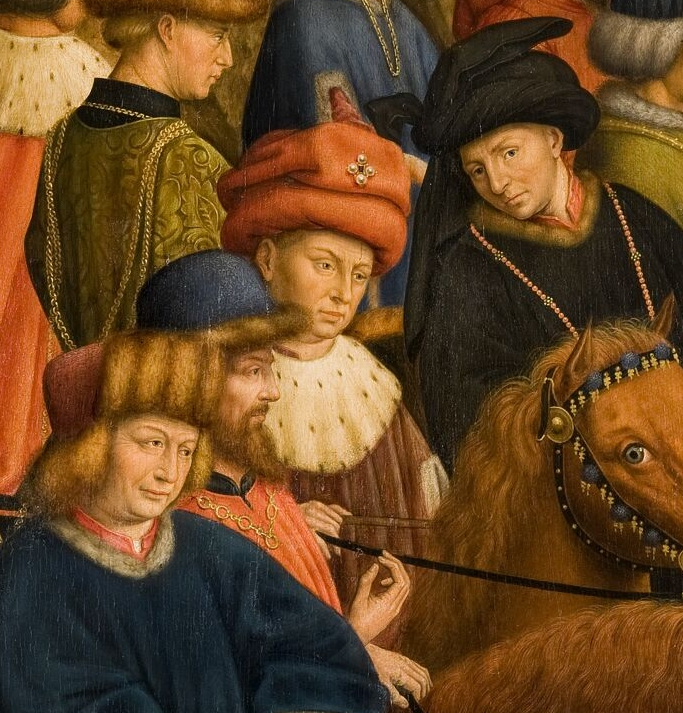
Closeup of the copy of the Just Judges, revealing the shaved horsemen in the middle, which was originally partially obscured by the brim of the hat worn by the bearded man, to be that of Leopold III of Belgium.

== See also ==
- List of famous stolen paintings
- August de Schryver

== Sources ==
- Charney, Noah. Stealing the Mystic Lamb. New York: PublicAffairs. 2010. ISBN 1-58648-800-7
