= Joris van der Paele =

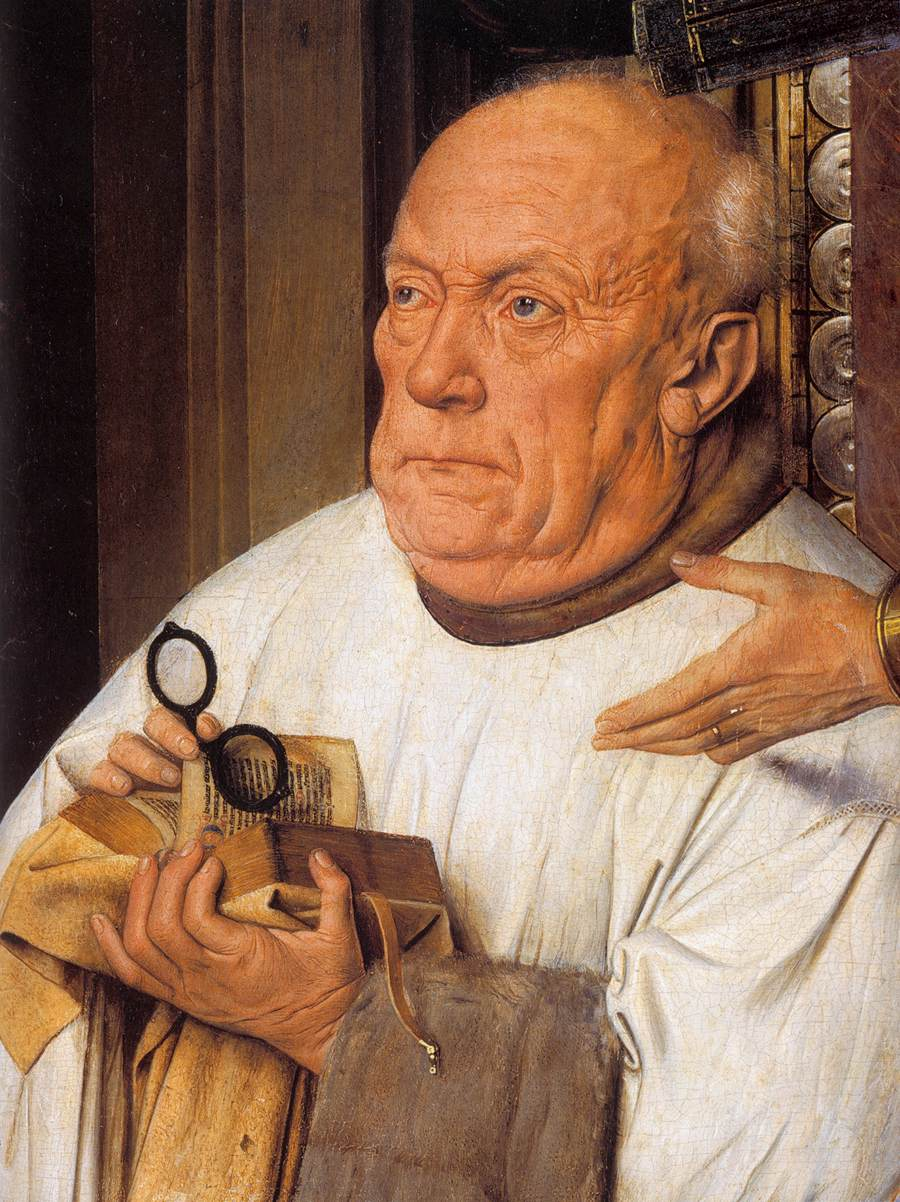
Detail of Jan van Eyck, Virgin and Child with Canon van der Paele, now in the Groeningemuseum, Bruges

Joris van der Paele or Georgius de Pala (c. 1370–1443) was a scribe in the papal chancery, a successful ecclesiastic, and a patron of the painter Jan van Eyck.

== Life ==
Joris van der Paele was born in or near Bruges around 1370, into a family with considerable clerical connections. Among these, both his uncle and his brother were to hold positions in Saint Donatian's Collegiate Church in Bruges. Joris became a clerk in minor orders of the diocese of Tournai at an early age, and was later ordained subdeacon but never received higher orders. He was appointed a prebendary of St Donatian's in 1387 and was installed on 22 March 1388. In 1394, during the Western Schism, he was deprived of his prebend due to his loyalty to Pope Boniface IX in Rome, the city of Bruges recognising Avignon as the seat of the papacy. By 1396, he had been appointed to a position in the Roman chancery, and by 1409, while still working in the papal chancery, he had been appointed to prebends in Utrecht, Maastricht, Strasbourg, Cologne, and Huy. In 1410, he was reappointed to a canonry of the church of St. Donatian in Bruges. In July 1418, he began a process of retirement. From 1425 he was permanently resident in Bruges.

In 1432, Van der Paele's health declined markedly. From 1434, he began to work on his legacy to the church, founding a chapel and commissioning a painting from Jan van Eyck. This was to become Virgin and Child with Canon van der Paele. He would have been in his sixties and suffering from temporal arteritis, when the painting was begun. In 1442, he founded a second chapel.

Van der Paele died in Bruges on 25 August 1443 and was buried in the chapel he had founded in the church of St Donatian.
