= Dresden Triptych =

Painting by Jan van Eyck

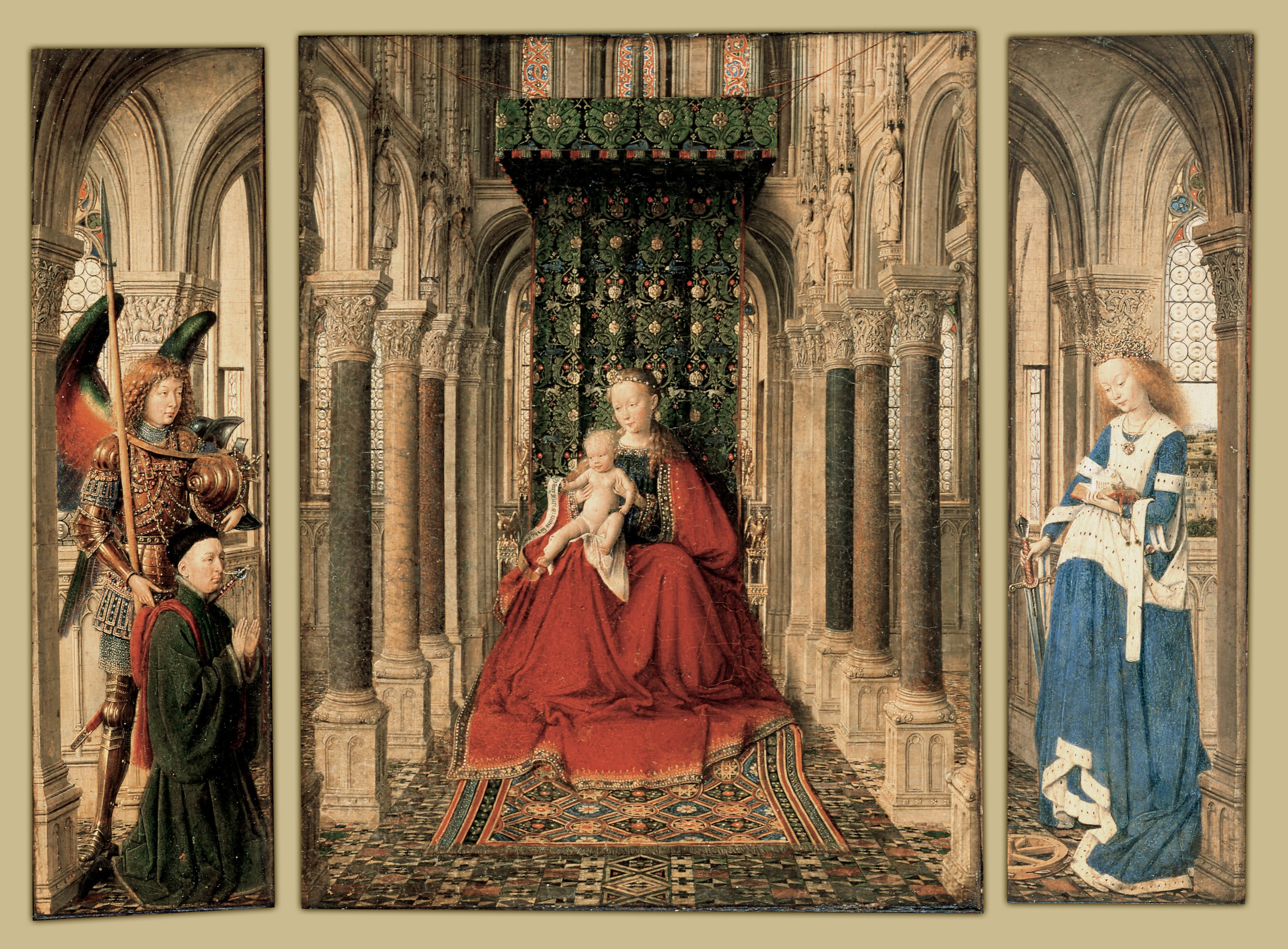
View of the interior of the triptych. The two outer wings contain an Annunciation scene in grisaille. Oil on oak panel, 1437. Gemäldegalerie Alte Meister, Dresden. 33.1cm × 13.6cm; 33.1cm × 27.5cm; 33.1cm × 13.6cm

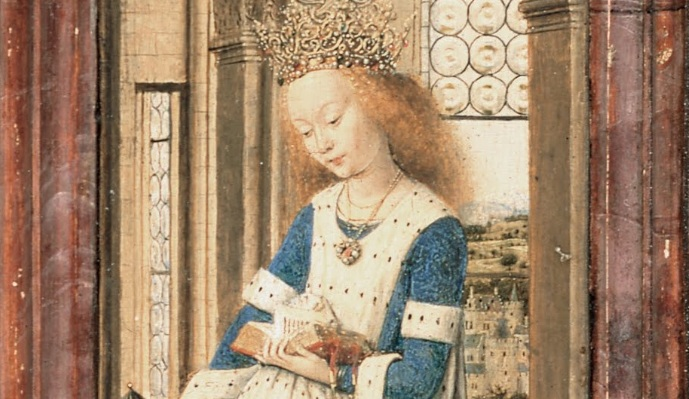
Detail of the right panel showing St. Catherine and the inner mouldings of the protective frame

The Dresden Triptych (or Virgin and Child with St. Michael and St. Catherine and a Donor, or Triptych of the Virgin and Child) is a very small hinged-triptych altarpiece by the Early Netherlandish painter Jan van Eyck. It consists of five individual panel paintings: a central inner panel, and two double-sided wings. It is signed and dated 1437, and in a permanent collection of the Gemäldegalerie Alte Meister in Dresden, with the panels still in their original frames. The only extant triptych attributed to van Eyck, and the only non-portrait signed with his personal motto, ALC IXH XAN ("I Do as I Can"), (Note: The words "As I Can" are a play on his name. Their spelling varies between examples, usually translated as Als ich can. See Dhanens (1980), 188, 385) the triptych can be placed at the midpoint of his known works. It echoes a number of the motifs of his earlier works while marking an advancement in his ability in handling depth of space, and establishes iconographic elements of Marian portraiture that were to become widespread by the latter half of the 15th century. Elisabeth Dhanens describes it as "the most charming, delicate and appealing work by Jan van Eyck that has survived".

The paintings of the two outer wings become visible when the triptych is closed. They show the Virgin Mary and Archangel Gabriel in an Annunciation scene painted in grisaille, which because of their near-monochrome colouring give the impression that the figures are sculpted. The three inner panels are set in an ecclesiastical interior. In the central inner panel Mary is seated and holds the Christ Child on her lap. On the left hand wing Archangel Michael presents a kneeling donor, while on the right St. Catherine of Alexandria stands reading a prayer book. The interior panels are outlined with two layers of painted bronze frames, inscribed with mostly Latin lettering. The texts are drawn from a variety of sources, in the central frames from biblical descriptions of the assumption, while the inner wings are lined with fragments of prayers dedicated to saints Michael and Catherine.

The work may have been intended for private devotion, perhaps as a portable altarpiece for a migrant cleric. That the frames are so richly decorated with Latin inscriptions indicates the donor, whose identity is lost, was highly educated and cultured. Because of a lack of surviving documentary evidence on commissions of 15th century-Northern painting, the identities of donors are often established through evidence gathered by modern art historians. In this work, damaged coats of arms on the borders of the interior wings have been identified with the Giustiniani of Genoa – an influential albergo active from 1362 – who established trade links with Bruges as early as the mid-14th century.

== Provenance and attribution ==
The Dresden Triptych was probably in the possession of the Giustiniani family in the mid- to late-15th century. It is mentioned in a May 10, 1597 record of a purchase by Vincenzo Gonzaga, Duke of Mantua, and was then sold with the Gonzaga Collection to Charles I of England in 1627. After Charles's fall and execution, the painting went to Paris and was owned by Eberhard Jabach, the Cologne-based banker and art dealer for Louis XIV and Cardinal Mazarin. A year after Jabach's death in 1695, it passed to the Elector of Saxony, and next appears in a 1754 inventory of the Dresden Collection, attributed to Albrecht Dürer, until the German historian Aloys Hirt in 1830 established it as a van Eyck. In the mid-19th century the Dresden catalogues first attribute it to Hubert van Eyck (d. 1426) and a few years later to Jan.

Jan van Eyck's Lucca Madonna, c. 1436. Städelsches Kunstinstitut, Frankfurt

Van Eyck signed, dated and added his motto to the central panel, a fact only discovered when the frame was removed in the course of a mid-20th century restoration, and confirmed with the 1959 discovery of the signature which is placed along with the words IOHANNIS DE EYCK ME FECIT ET C[OM]PLEVIT ANNO D[OMINI] MCCCCXXXVII.ALC IXH XAN ("Jan Van Eyck Made And Completed Me In The Year 1437. As I Can"). The word "completed" (complevit) may suggest the completion date, but as master painters of the era typically had workshops to assist on major works, the wording can be seen as aggressively socially ambitious; perhaps an arrogant master painter indicating his workshop assistants had little material involvement in the panels, and that he was primarily responsible for its design and execution. This view is reinforced by the fact that it is the only non-portrait to contain van Eyck's motto, ALC IXH XAN. Until the discovery of the signature the piece was variously dated to an early piece from the 1420s to his later period in the late 1430s. Because the panels are so definitely attributed they are often used as a touchstone to date van Eyck's other works; there are a number of evident stylistic developments, including the type of stained glass windows and mouldings around the arcades, and his ability at handling perspective, which can be used to determine if other works at least pre-date the triptych.

The central panel has often been compared to his unsigned and undated Lucca Madonna of c. 1436. That work echoes the central panel of the Dresden triptych in a number of aspects, including the dark green canopy, the figuration and positioning of Mary, her heavily-folded dress, the orange and brown pigments of the floor, the geometric carpet and the wooden carvings. The Lucca Madonna is thought to be a portrait of the artist's much younger wife, Margaret.

== Description ==
The work measures 33 by 27.5 centimetres (13.0 in × 10.8 in) including the frames. Given this miniaturist scale, the triptych probably functioned as a portable devotional piece, or altare portabile. Members of the upper-classes and nobility acquired these through papal dispensation, to use during travel and typically during pilgrimage. Van Eyck's patron and employer Philip the Good owned at least one portable triptych of which fragments survive.

The three inner panels comprise a typical sacra conversazione, a form established in Italy in the latter half of the 14th century with a patron saint presenting the donor, usually kneeling, to an enthroned "Deity or Mother of God". John Ward believes the rich and complex iconography and symbolic meaning van Eyck employed in his religious panels served to highlight the co-existence the artist saw between the spiritual and material worlds. In his earlier paintings, subtle iconographical features – referred to as disguised symbolism – are typically woven into the work, as "relatively small, in the background, or in the shadow [details]". These elements include the apparition of the Virgin before the donor, whose panel contains carvings that seem to be reflective of events of his life. In his religious panels after 1436, van Eyck's reliance on iconographical or symbolic elements is greatly reduced. Ward speculates the reduced size of the work or the wishes of the commissioner influenced this choice, or he "decided that he had exhausted the most interesting possibilities and ... much of his carefully planned symbolism went unappreciated by patrons or by viewers." According to Jacobs, the work reflects a system of symbolism in so far as heavenly and earthly objects are juxtaposed. This is most evident in the disparity between the monochromatic exterior and vivid inner panels.

=== Frames ===
The triptych retains its original frames, which are both ornate and serve to protect the piece from the effects of light and smoke during travel and when in situ. The inner frames have recessed mouldings and are carved with gilded inscriptions, and the top corners of the two wing panels each bear a carved set of coat of arms. The lettering and phrases in Latin serve a dual purpose. They are decorative, similar to margins in medieval manuscripts, and set the context for the imagery; van Eyck would have expected the viewer to contemplate text and imagery in unison. Writing about Early Netherlandish triptychs, Jacobs says the inscriptions serve to distinguish and separate between the worldly and spiritual spheres, with the panels showing earthly images while the inscriptions on the frames act as reminder of heavenly influence. The letterings reinforce the duality between the earthly and heavenly, with St. Catherine's a reminder of ascetic piety while the figure herself is depicted in sumptuous garments and jewels.

The inscriptions on the central panel are fragments from the Book of Wisdom (7:26 and 7:29), and Ecclesiastes (24: 23–24). (Note: The lettering on that panel reads: HEC EST SPECIOSIOR SOLE ET SUPER OMNEM DISPOSTITIONEM STELLARUM LUCI COMPARATA INVENITUR PRIOR. CANDOR EST ENIM LUCIS AETERNAE ET SPECULUM SINE MACULA DEI MAIESTATIS ECT. EGO QUASI VITIS FRUCTIVICAVI SUAVITATEM ODORIS ET FLORES MEI FRUCTIS HONORIS ET HONESTATIS. ECO MATER PULCHARAE DILECTIONIS ET TIMORIS ET MAGNITUDINES ET SANCTAE SPEI ("She is more beautiful than the sun and above the whole order of the stars. Being compared with the light of day, she is found to excel. For she is the brightness of eternal light, and the flawless mirror of God's majesty. As a vine I have brought forth a pleasant fragrance, and my flowers are the fruit of honour and probity. I am the mother of fair love, and of fear, and of greatness, and of holy hope"). see Dhanens (1980), 385; Heath (2008), 110) Those on the wing panels are taken from texts referring directly to the two saints.

=== Inner panels ===
==== Virgin and Child ====
In the central panel, the Virgin and Child are enthroned in a church nave within a columned basilica running on either side. The columns are painted using a variety of dark red, orange and grey pigments, a colour scheme which Peter Heath describes as lending to a "sense of airy silence". The throne is positioned on a dais, before a lavishly detailed oriental carpet lying on a similarly geometrically designed tiled floor. The arms of the canopied throne and the arches to either side contain carved or sculptured figures, including tiny representations of Isaac, and David and Goliath, although art historian Antje Maria Neuner reads this carving as showing Jephthah sacrificing his daughter. Mary wears a richly embroidered and as is typical for van Eyck, voluminous red robe, which effectively serves as a cloth of honour. The robe is placed over a blue square-cut underdress edged with a jewelled border. In van Eyck's Marian paintings, he almost always clothes her in red writes Pächt, which makes her seem to dominate the space. The use of red overclothes with a blue underdress is representative of her holy nature, represented by blue, in a human corporeal form, represented by red. The Christ Child is naked and holds towards the donor a banderole adorned with a phrase from the Gospel of Matthew (11:29), DISCITE A ME, QUIA MITIS SUM ET HUMILIS CORDE ("Learn of me, for I am meek and lowly in heart").

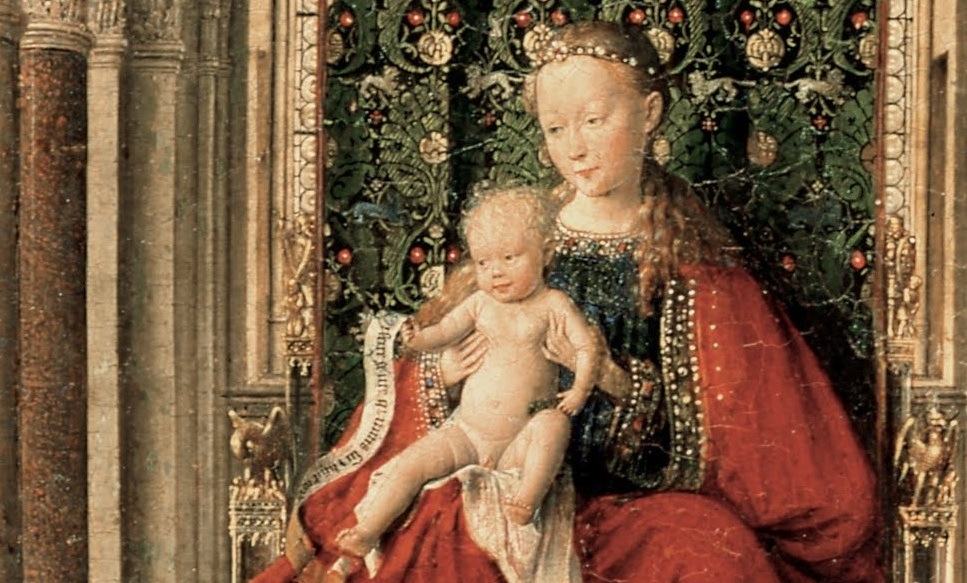
Detail showing the Virgin and Child sitting on the canopied throne with multi-coloured marble columns to the left

Mary's presence in the church is symbolic; she and the child occupy the area where the altar would normally be situated. Like van Eyck's two other late Madonna portraits (Virgin and Child with Canon van der Paele of 1436 and Madonna in the Church of c. 1438–40), Mary is unrealistically large and out of proportion to her surroundings. This reflects the influence of 12th- and 13th-century Italian artists such as Cimabue and Giotto, who in turn drew on the tradition of monumental depictions of Mary from Byzantine icons. According to Lorne Campbell, Mary is presented as if about to "rise from her throne and advance into the same plane as St. Michael and St. Catherine, she would tower above them and also above the columns of the church." This idea is in keeping with van Eyck's tendency in such portraits to present Mary as if she was an apparition materialising before the donor in response to his prayer and devotion. Van Eyck's Mary is here monumental, but less overwhelmingly large than in 13th century works. She is disproportionate to the architecture in her panel, but approximately proportional to the figures in the wings. This restraint evidences the beginning of van Eyck's mature phase, most evidently seen in the composition's "greater spatial depth".

Christ's pose closely follows that of the Paele Madonna; his body still leans towards the donor but here his head faces the viewer more directly.

==== Saints and donor wings ====
St. Catherine and the Archangel Michael occupy the right and left hand panels respectively. They appear to stand in either the aisles or ambulatories, and a few bays to the fore compared to the central panel. Their depictions are in keeping with the artist's evolving style: the aisles convey spaciousness, especially by the implied spaces out of view, while both saints subtly lean close to Mary. The use of perspective makes the saints appear small; according to Pächt they are "less solid than the massive figures in the Paele Madonna. It was this Gothic daintiness that led many scholars ... to place this among Jan van Eyck's early work". The two side panels are filled with light streaming through the windows that reflects off the saints' accoutrements, glinting from St. Michael's armour and St. Catherine's bejewelled steel sword.

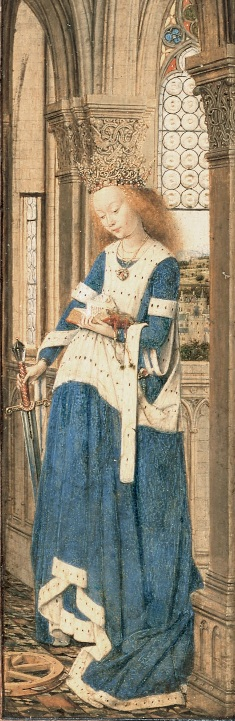
Detail showing a crowned St. Catherine. She can be identified through the various hagiographical objects around her.

On the right panel St. Catherine is presented as almost the essence of a gothic princess. She stands reading a book in "ravishing modesty", with unbound blonde hair, which is topped with an elaborate jewelled crown very similar to that in the Madonna of Chancellor Rolin, combined with her rich blue gown and tabard of white draped ermine showing her as the princess she was. A golden chain with a jewelled pendant hangs from her neck. The attributes associated with her are included in her depiction. In her right hand, she holds the sword used for her beheading and at her feet lies the breaking wheel on which she was tortured. Like the woman in van Eyck's Arnolfini Portrait she is "fashionably pear-shaped"; Heath describes her attire as "more dazzling than the Virgin's", mirroring St. Michael's splendid armour on the opposite panel.

St. Catherine's presence can be attributed to a number of factors. At that period her reputation and popularity were second to Mary's; she was both an educated and an outspoken woman during her lifetime – characteristics that perhaps mirrored the donor's. She is absorbed in her book in a contemplative manner, which might be reflective of a donor with a similar temperament. The frame of her wing is inscribed with the words VIRGO PRUDENS ANELAVIT, GRANUM SIBI RESERVAVIT, VENTILANDO PALEAM. DISIPLINUS EST IMBUTA PUELLA COELESTIBUS, NUDA NUDUM EST SECUTA CHRISTUM PASSIBUS, DUM MUNDANIS EST EXUTA ECT ("The prudent virgin has longed for the starry throne where she has made her place ready; leaving the world's threshing floor, she saved the grain for herself by winnowing the chaff. The young girl has been steeped in heavenly learning. Stripped of everything, with sure footsteps she followed Christ until she was delivered from earthly affairs").

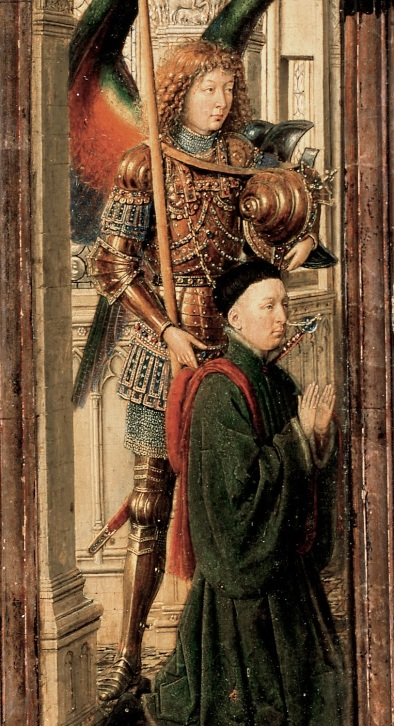
Detail of the Archangel Michael presenting the donor. Note the two faux bronze painted frames.

A landscape can be seen through the window behind St. Catherine. Because of the miniature scale of the painting it can be seen only at close up. The view is built with extremely fine brushwork and shows a number of highly detailed buildings and hills before snowcapped mountains.

A lance rests against the shoulder of a youthful-looking St. Michael. Michael is dressed in elaborately jewelled and coloured armour, his left arm holding his helmet, while his right hand rests on the shoulder of the donor as he is presented to Mary. The donor kneels in prayer before the Virgin, with his hands held upwards as if in prayer, although they are not clasped. He wears a gold ring on his right small finger, and is dressed in a long olive-green houppelande, at the time the height of fashion and an indicator of status within the Burgundian court. The gown has a fur-lined high collar and deep baggy sleeves, also lined with fur. The donor's bowl-shaped haircut, rounded at the fringe but cut above his ears, is also typical of mid-1430s Netherlandish fashion. Except for the red hood, the garment closely resembles that worn by the groom in the Arnolfini Portrait.

The capital of the pillar above the donor's head is lined with carvings of military scenes. Similar carvings are seen near the donor in van Eyck's earlier van der Paele and Madonna of Chancellor Rolin, where they depict events or personal circumstances from the donor's life. Those in the present work likely serve a similar role, however, because the donor is unidentified it is unknown as to what they may refer. Elisabeth Dhanens speculates that they might depict the sarcophagus of Hippolytus in Pisa, which she believes adds credibility to the belief the donor was of Italian origin; she also notes the military scene reflects St. Michael's status as military commander. Ward compares the carving to a similar one found in the Washington Annunciation. Unlike in van Eyck's earlier votive portraits the donor is positioned at a remove from the Marian apparition, and at a much smaller scale to Mary on a triptych wing.

The lettering running along the edges of the panel's frame consists of a prayer fragment from the liturgy for the feast of St. Michael. The extract reads HIC EST ARCHANGELUS PRINCEPS MILITAE ANGELORUM CUIUS HONOR PRAESTAT BENEFICIA POPULORUM ET ORATARIO PERDUCIT AD REGNA COELORUM. HIC ANGELUS MICHAEL DEI NUNTIUS DE ANIMABUS JUSTIS. GRATIA DEI ILLE VICTOR IN COELIS RESEDIT. A PACIBUS ("This is Michael the Archangel, leader of the angelic hosts, whose privilege it is to grant favours to the people, and whose prayer leads them to the Kingdom of Heaven. The Archangel Michael is God's messenger for the souls of the just. By the grace of God, that great victor has taken his place in Heaven, on the side of peace'").

=== Outer panels ===
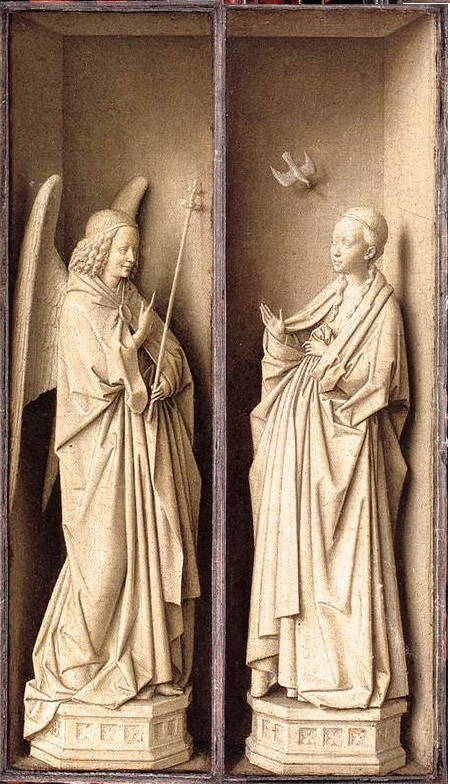
The closed view shows an Annunciation, with imitation statues of the Archangel Gabriel and Mary.

When the triptych is closed, the outer wings reveal an Annunciation scene with the Archangel Gabriel and Mary painted in grisaille. The figures form an illusionistic imitation of sculpture, a conceit which van Eyck extends by placing them on octagonal pedestals. The figures are illuminated by light from the left, a device van Eyck often used to imply the presence of God. A dove, representing the Holy Spirit, hovers above Mary. Because the dove is also in grisaille but not attached to a pedestal and apparently floating unfixed above the saints, its presence serves to highlight that the viewer is not looking at sculpture but at a painted representation of sculpture.

The annunciation dominates any other theme on the outer wings of Northern 15th-century polyptychs. The tradition originates from Byzantine art, with van Eyck largely responsible for re-popularising the practice. Along with his Ghent Altarpiece, the Dresden Triptych is one of the earliest surviving examples of the technique, and on this basis he is usually credited as the innovator of a motif that became almost standard from the mid-15th century. As the annunciation marks the incarnation of Christ, its representation on the outer wings gives symmetry to the scenes of his life typically detailed on the inner panels.

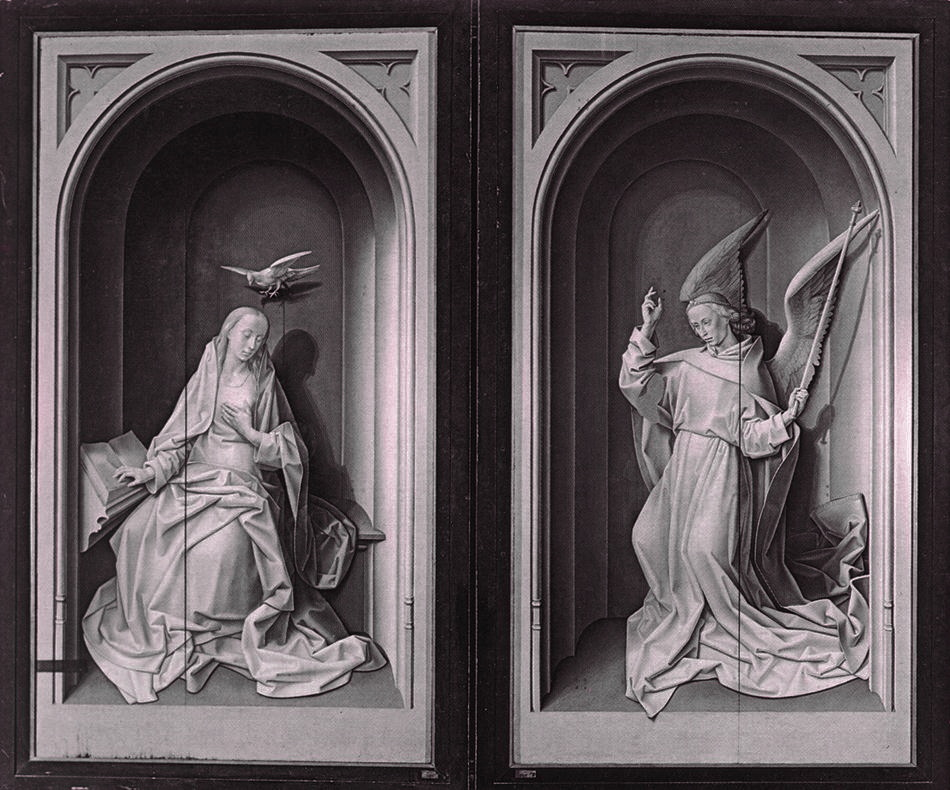
Outer wings of Hugo van der Goes's Portinari Altarpiece, c. 1475. Galleria degli Uffizi, Florence. Van der Goes closely follows the convention established by van Eyck, although he omits the octagonal pedestals typical of actual sculpture.

The outer wings of 15th-century diptychs and triptychs typically contained Annunciation scenes painted in grisaille. Molly Teasdale Smith believes the practice echoes the tradition of covering religious imagery with grey cloth during the then-46-day lenten period leading up to Easter. There is a symmetry with this in how polyptychs were typically kept closed except for Sundays or church holidays, when they were opened to reveal the more colourful and expansive inner panels.

According to Dhanens, the sculptural depictions on the outer panels are a "brilliant success ... in imparting a sense of life to the supposed statues." The wings continue van Eyck's innovation in placing two grisaille outer panels wings of polyptychs; the earliest extant example being the Annunciation wings of the Ghent Altarpiece.

== Architecture ==
The depicted church is of a Romanesque style with Gothic elements. There are pointed canopies above Mary, and the nave is narrow, barely wide enough to contain her. It is walled by a colonnade joined by entablatures and capped with rounded arches. The columns are variously of pink, red and purple marble. Each of the capitals is decorated with faux carvings, some showing representations of the twelve apostles under a small baldachin. The vaulting is visible in the aisles but not in the central nave. There are a number of implied spaces not visible to the viewer. The central panel contains two on either side of the pillars, others lead from the balcony above the throne, and there are unseen exits to hallways at the rear of the two wing panels. The east facing windows in the right hand wing resemble those in van Eyck's Rolin Madonna.

The centre panel's spatial depth marks an advancement in van Eyck's technique, especially when compared to his similar 1436 Diptych of the Annunciation or van der Paele panel, both of which are comparatively flat. The depth of space is accomplished through such devices as placing the Virgin at the far end of the pictorial space, making her appear both smaller and seemingly at a remove and accentuating the receding lines of the carpets by setting them against the parallels of the folds of her gown. The recessional perspective is further achieved by the sequence of columns stretching back from the throne. This is particularly noticeable with the positioning of the throne in comparison to the Lucca Madonna and van der Paele panels.

As with van Eyck's earlier paintings of interiors, the building is not based on a particular place, but is an imagined and idealised formation of what he viewed as a perfect and representational architectural space. This is evidenced by a number of features that would be unlikely in an actual contemporary church such as the sculptures that were more secular in nature. In detailing the structure he pays close attention to contemporary models, which he possibly combined with elements from ancient buildings. The columns contain "high prismatic bases" found in early churches and on the Arch of Constantine. Craig Harbison believes that because the interior is not based on an actual building, the viewer is not burdened by preconceptions, a device which perhaps opens up the painting's "physiological" impact. In his view, the panels capture the moment when the donor's prayer and piety is rewarded by an apparition of the Virgin and Child. The novelty and unworldliness of the situation is highlighted by the unrealistic size of the Virgin compared to her surroundings.

Light plays a central role in all panels, to an extent almost comparable to van Eyck's Madonna in the Church. The arches and columns are bathed in daylight, echoed by the text of the inscriptions around the central frame allude to light and illumination. Van Eyck pays close attention to the saturating effects and gradations of the light, which enters from the left and spreads across the middle ranges of each panel. He often used light to indicate a divine ethereal presence. Because the implied spaces found on either side of Mary and leading into each of the wing panels are bathed in this light, they can be seen as conduits for the divine.

The triptych influenced Rogier van der Weyden's 1445–50 Seven Sacraments Altarpiece in a number of aspects, most obviously in its disregard of scale, especially with Mary's size relative to the other figures and surrounding architecture. Van der Weyden develops the idea further, placing a large crucifixion towering above the figures and almost spanning the height of the central panel.

== Donor ==
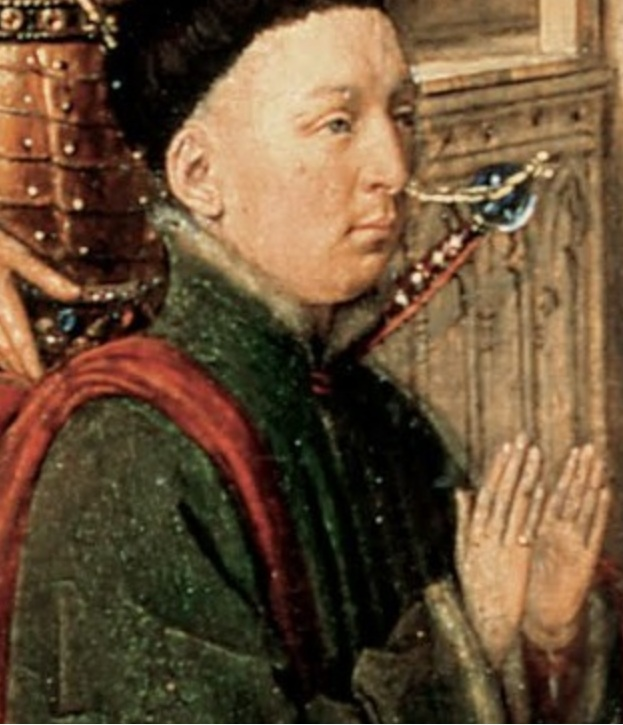
Detail showing the donor. Unusually his hands are held up but unclasped, suggesting that he is caught in wonder rather than prayer.

The identity of the donor has not been established, although a number of suggestions have been advanced over the last 200 years. Harbison suggests the work's small scale indicates that it functioned as a portable altarpiece rather than as a private devotional work, and thus was commissioned by or for a member of the clergy. Other art historians have argued that the donor may have been a Genoese merchant. This belief has been fed by the triptych's similarity to Giovanni Mazone's Virgin and Child altarpiece in Pontremoli, Tuscany, which may place it in the Italian region of Liguria at latest by the end of the 15th century. Damaged coats of arms on the inner frames have been linked to the Giustiniani family, known for establishing trade links with Bruges in the 14th and 15th centuries. If not commissioned by that family, historical record place the work at least in their possession by the end of the century. In the early 1800s, Frances Weale attempted to place Michele Giustiniani as the donor, however later historical research has been unable to verify his presence in Bruges around 1437, and he seems to have returned to Italy by 1430.

Mid-twentieth century technical examination revealed the Giustiniani coats of arms may have been painted over an earlier heraldic design, perhaps as early as the 15th century, whose significance and history is now lost. Dhanens theorises that a member of the Giustiniani family may have established other associations with St. Michael and St. Catherine, advancing that they were a member of the Italian Rapondi family, (Note: The Rapondis had strong banking ties to the Burgundian dukes and were active in Paris and the Low Countries. See Small, Graham. "The City, the Duke and Their Banker: The Rapondi Family and the Formation of the Burgundian State (1384–1430)". The Economic History Review. Volume 60, No. 3 (Aug., 2007), 626–627) whose trading house in Paris was named after St. Catherine. Their daughter, also named Catherine, married the Italian merchant Michel Burlamacchi (Bollemard in Flemish) from Lucca, who was active in Bruges. From this Dhanens theorises the piece was commissioned as a wedding gift for the couple. Documents show weavers in Wervik paid taxes to Catherine Rapondi and in September 1434, when Michele Burlamacchi was tax collector in that town, van Eyck received a stipend funded by local tax receipts, suggesting a connection. Dhanens admits the donor's identity is lost, but she says of the piece that "it could have been a gift from the husband to the wife, a pledge of his affection during his absences; or it could have been a gift from the wife to the husband, by way of protection on his travels."

== Condition ==
The triptych is in poor condition, having suffered damage and heavy paint loss, and has undergone a number of restorations. The outer wooden frames, originally painted in grey and yellow marbling, were later overpainted in a design of black and red in the 16th or 17th century when "a faux turtle-shell design, imitating the then-fashionable veneer, replaced the earlier scheme of jaspered paint". An ebony surround was added to the inner frames for protection in the 1840s. There has been extensive repair work on the paint forming Mary's dress, with large areas of her gown repaired in 1844 by painter Eduard Bendemann. The badly damaged coats of arms have been retouched, while the frames have sustained impairment and are overpainted in areas. The painting was taken to Moscow after the Second World War. It was returned in 1959 after it had been cleaned, restored and underwent examination in a laboratory. This process revealed the ALC IXH XAN inscription on the inner moulding of the central frame in front of the tiled floor when a coat of brown paint was stripped away. The surround was removed during the 1959 restoration.

== Sources ==
=== Bibliography ===
- Blum, Shirley. Early Netherlandish Triptychs: A Study in Patronage. Los Angeles: University of California Press, 1969
- Borchert, Till-Holger. Van Eyck. London: Taschen, 2008. ISBN 3-8228-5687-8
- Campbell, Lorne. "Jan Van Eyck. Dresden and Bruges". The Burlington Magazine, Volume 148, No. 1235, February 2006. 138–140
- Campbell, Lorne. Van der Weyden. London: Chaucer Press, 2004. ISBN 1-904449-24-7
- Dhanens, Elisabeth. Hubert and Jan van Eyck. New York: Tabard Press, 1980. ISBN 0-914427-00-8
- Harbison, Craig. The Art of the Northern Renaissance. London: Laurence King Publishing, 1995. ISBN 1-78067-027-3
- Harbison, Craig. Jan van Eyck, The Play of Realism. London: Reaktion Books, 1991. ISBN 0-948462-18-3
- Heath, Peter. "Justice & Mercy: the Patron of Jan Van Eyck's Dresden Triptych". Apollo, March 2008. 106–113
- Jacobs, Lynn F. Opening Doors: The Early Netherlandish Triptych Reinterpreted. University Park: Penn State University Press, 2012. ISBN 0-271-04840-9
- Luber, Katherine. "Patronage and Pilgrimage: Jan van Eyck, the Adornes Family, and Two Paintings of 'Saint Francis in Portraiture'". Philadelphia Museum of Art Bulletin, Volume 91, No. 386/387, Spring 1988. 24–37
- Nash, Susie. Northern Renaissance art. Oxford: Oxford University Press, 2008. ISBN 0-19-284269-2
- Pächt, Otto. Van Eyck and the Founders of Early Netherlandish Painting. London: Harvey Miller Publishers, 1999. ISBN 1-872501-28-1
- Smith, Jeffrey Chipps. The Northern Renaissance. London: Phaidon Press, 2004. ISBN 0-7148-3867-5
- Teasdale-Smith, Molly. "On the Donor of Jan van Eyck's Rolin Madonna". Gesta, Volume 20, No. 1, 1981. 273–279
- Ward, John. "Disguised Symbolism as Enactive Symbolism in Van Eyck's Paintings". Artibus et Historiae, Volume 15, No. 29, 1994. 9–53
- Ward, John. "Hidden Symbolism in Jan van Eyck's Annunciations". The Art Bulletin, Volume 57, No. 2, January 1975. 196–220
- Weale, Frances. Hubert and John Van Eyck. New York: Longman's, 1903
