= Jules Desneux =

Belgian dermatologist, entomologist, numismatist and art historian

Jules Desneux (20 April 1885 – 4 January 1962) was a French-Belgian entomologist, dermatologist, art historian, and numismatist. He specialized in the study of termites and also took an interest in termitophilic and myrmecophilic beetles, particularly the Paussinae. He was among the first to make use of radiology to study the structure of termite nests.

== Biography ==
Desneux was born in Brussels in a family of French-origin artisans. His father was a cabinet maker and designer. He studied humanities at the Athenee royal d'Ixelles from 1896 and at the age of 17 met Auguste Lameere and learned about termites and examined some collections from Africa that resulted in a paper in 1902. In 1903 he joined the Universite Libre de Bruxelles and graduated in medicine in 1910 specializing in dermatology at Paris. He lectured on dermatology at the University from 1911 to 1918 and then worked at the Brussels general hospital. Desneux was a member of the Royal entomological society of Belgium from 1902.

Desneux collected coins and in 1930 he described ancient Greek coinage and was a member of the numismatics society, serving as its president from 1955 to 1957 and again from 1958 to 1961. He was especially interested in coins with markings of insect symbols. He was also interested in art investigation and used infra-red photography to examine hidden drawings under the paintings by Jan van Eyck.

While examining a restoration of The Virgin and Child with Canon van der Paele by van Eyck, Desneux noted that certain skin lesions on the lower lip had been painted over. He had diagnosed the condition from a pre-restoration photograph as a plaque keratosique, a potential malignant squamous cell carcinoma for which dermatologist would have prescribed a diagnostic biopsy.
