= Albert Philippot =

Albert Philippot (1899, Couillet, Charleroi - 1974, Woluwe-Saint-Pierre, Brussels) was a Belgian painter and art restorer.

== Life ==
He entered the Brussels Academy in 1918 and was initially influenced by his tutors Jean Delville and Constant Montald, though in a vein that was more lyrical than intellectual. In the 1920s he produced large decorative works in tempera as well as developing his oil technique between 1926 and 1930 on portraits, nudes, interiors and landscapes. He also drew on old masters and their techniques, influencing his own work as well as his restorations.

His studio was set on fire by a bomb in 1944, destroying most of his oeuvre, leading him to abandon painting to concentrate on restoration, in which he had been trained by his father-in-law Jef Van der Veken. He did still produce oil studies and brown chalk drawings until around 1950, mainly portraits and landscapes.
