= Giovanni Mazone =

Italian painter

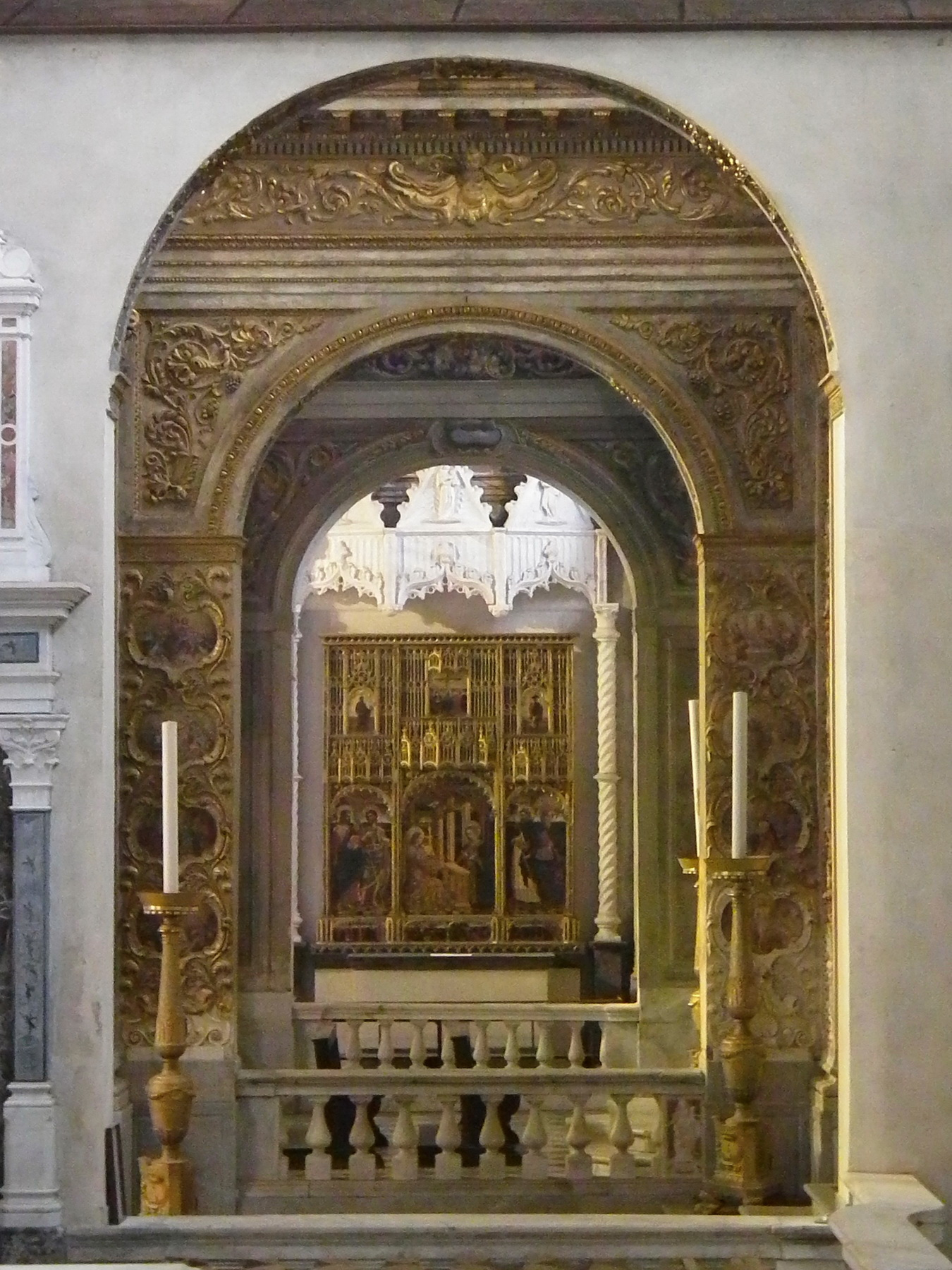
Giovanni Mazone Annunciation altarpiece at Santa Maria di Castello cathedral, Genoa

Giovanni Mazone (or Masone, Mazzoni) (c.1453 – c. 1510) was an Italian painter and woodcarver active in Genoa. Born in Alessandria, he was released from his familial bonds (patria potesta) in 1453 when he is documented to have established a workshop in Genoa. Giovanni's father, Giacomo, was also a painter and the family is first mentioned in 1414, in regards to a rental dispute.

His first documented piece is from 1463 for a relief carving of a chapel's altar in Genoa Cathedral, at which time he would have met Vincenzo Foppa who came to Liguria as specified by that contract, and who would later influence Mazone's style. He received another carving contract in 1476 to renovate the main altar in the cathedral. His workshop specialized in making wood frames for polyptychs, and documentation shows he ran a busy establishment.

In the mid-1460s he made a polyptych, now dispersed, of Saint Nicholas, heavily decorated with gilded relief work. His Annunciation polyptych, now held at Santa Maria di Castello shows Netherlandish influences, particularly in the rendering of the central panel. Jan van Eyck's portable altarpiece, the Dresden Triptych, was in Liguria in Italy by the end of the 15th century, and apparently influenced Mazone's style.

Another polyptych, Virgin and Child Enthroned with the Four Evangelists, shows a number of influences, including Netherlandish and Provençal. Documented workshop assistants from that period probably brought additional stylistic elements to the piece. His single signed and dated work, Noli me tangere was probably produced at about the same period as his triptych of the Nativity.

From the 1480s, his ability with perspective grew, when under Foppa's influence he painted Virgin and Child Enthroned and St. Mark with Four Saints. His 1489 Nativity, painted for the Sistine Chapel shows a complete break with Netherlandish influences and a movement toward a Paduan style. This piece was commissioned by Giuliano della Rovere, who went on to become Pope Julius II.
