= Lucca Madonna =

Painting by Jan van Eyck

- Artist: Jan van Eyck
- Year: 1436
- Medium: Oil on panel
- Dimensions: 65.7 cm × 49.6 cm (25.9 in × 19.5 in)
- Location: Städelsches Kunstinstitut, Frankfurt

The Lucca Madonna is an oil painting by the Early Netherlandish master Jan van Eyck, painted in approximately 1437. It shows Mary seated on a wooden throne and crowned by a canopy, breastfeeding the infant Christ. Its carpentry suggests it was once the inner panel of a triptych, while its small size indicates it was meant for private devotion. The painting is in the collection of the Städel Museum, Frankfurt.

It is known as Lucca Madonna as it belonged to the collection of Charles II, Duke of Parma and Lucca in the early 19th century. It is one of the last works by Jan van Eyck. The Virgin has been identified as a portrait of the painter's wife, Margaretha, of whom van Eyck also made a secular portrait.

== Iconography ==
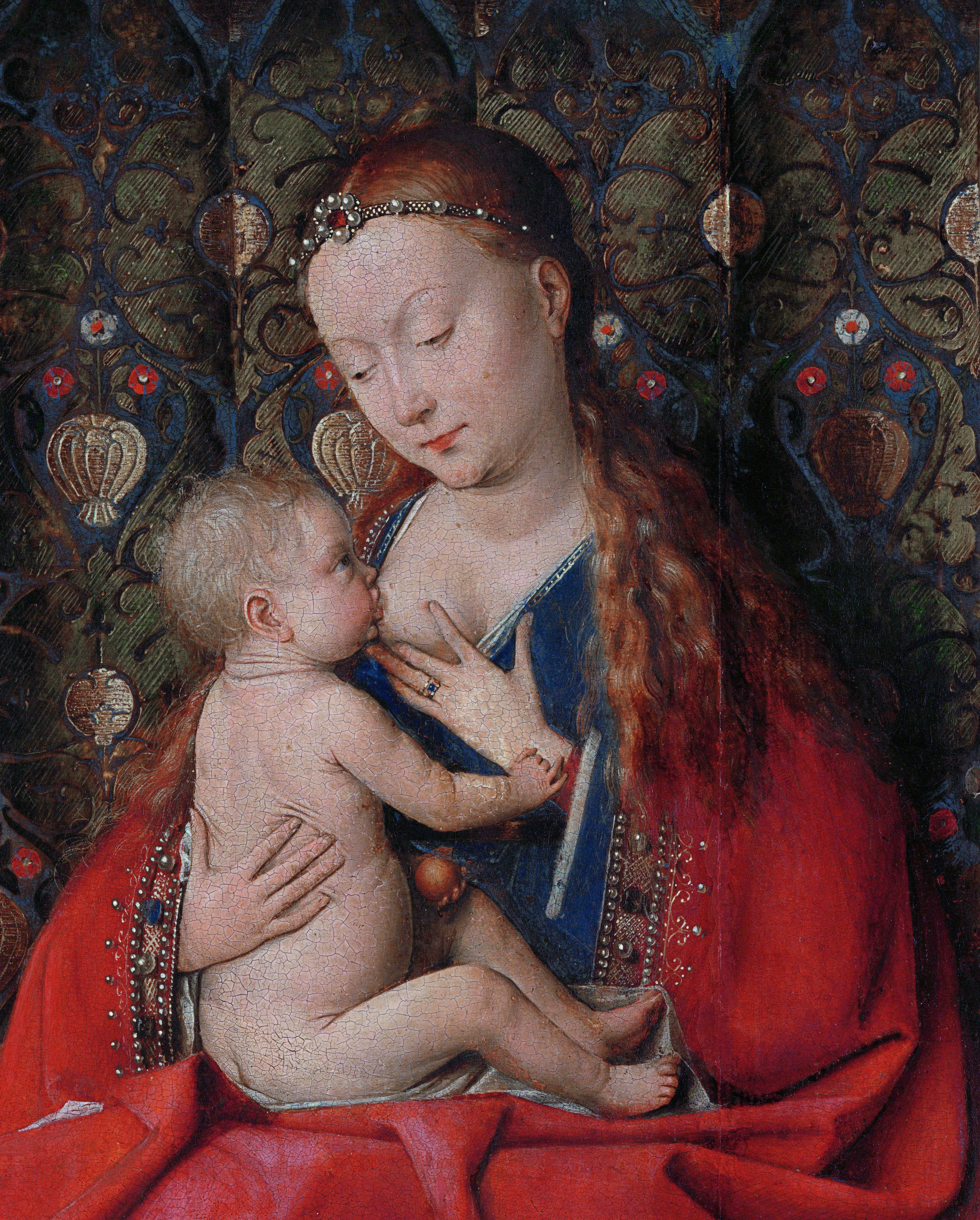
Detail

The Virgin sits on a wooden throne crowned by a canopy, with four small lion statues made of brass. This is a reference to the throne of Solomon which had twelve lions on the sides and steps. The iconography mixes the earlier style of the "Nursing Madonna" with the "Throne of Wisdom". As the Speculum Humanae Salvationis put it: "the throne of the true Solomon is the most Blessed Virgin Mary, In which sat Jesus Christ, the true wisdom."

As in many paintings by van Eyck and his contemporaries, this comparison is further elaborated by specifically depicting Mary similar to an altar, in that she supports the infant Christ on her lap, shown oversized and flattened, just as the altar supports the presence of Christ in the host at Mass. The white cloth beneath him, over the richer coloured cloth of Mary's dress, and the niche to the right, which resembles a piscina where water for the priest to wash his hands was kept, all contribute to the comparison. The unusual shape of the room, very narrow for such a large chair, suggests a small chapel.

The two fruits on the windowsill have not been positively identified, but they are either apples or oranges, both of which would be allusions to paradise. The window is crafted with crown glass, (bullseyes), set within a lead lattice framework. The right side wall is a mirror image of the window, while a shelf contains an empty candlestick and a half-filled glass carafe, or flask. There is a large bowl or sink on the lower ledge. The floor tiles are formed from blue and white, geometrical patterns, covered mainly by the carpet centered around the base of the throne.

== Position in van Eyck's oeuvre ==
The Lucca Madonna is one of six extant Madonna paintings by van Eyck that are dated to the period between his completion of the Ghent Altarpiece and his death in June 1441. These are:

- The Dresden Triptych of 1437, where, like in the Lucca Madonna, the Madonna wears two rings on her left ring finger
- The Madonna in the Church, Gemäldegalerie
- The Madonna of Chancellor Rolin, Musée du Louvre

== See also ==
- List of works by Jan van Eyck

== Sources ==
=== References ===
- Gallwitz, Klaus (ed). Besuch im Städel – Betrachtungen zu Bildern. Insel Taschenbuchverlag, Frankfurt 1986, ISBN 3-458-32639-1
- Harbison, Craig. "Jan van Eyck: The Play of Realism". Reaktion Books, 1997. ISBN 0-948462-79-5
- Lane, Barbara G. The Altar and the Altarpiece, Sacramental Themes in Early Netherlandish Painting. Harper & Row, 1984, ISBN 0-06-430133-8
- Pächt, Otto. Van Eyck – die Begründer der altniederländischen Malerei. Prestel Verlag, München 1989, ISBN 3-7913-1033-X
- Purtle, Carol J. The Marian Paintings of Jan van Eyck. Princeton University Press, Princeton, New Jersey 1982
- Sander, Jochen (ed). Fokus auf Jan van Eyck: Lukas Madonna, um 1437/1438 (Inv. Nr. 944). Publication of the Städel Museum, 2006
- Végh, János. Jan van Eyck. Henschelverlag Kunst und Gesellschaft, Berlin 1984
