= Virgin and Child with Canon van der Paele =

Panel painting c. 1434 by Jan van Eyck

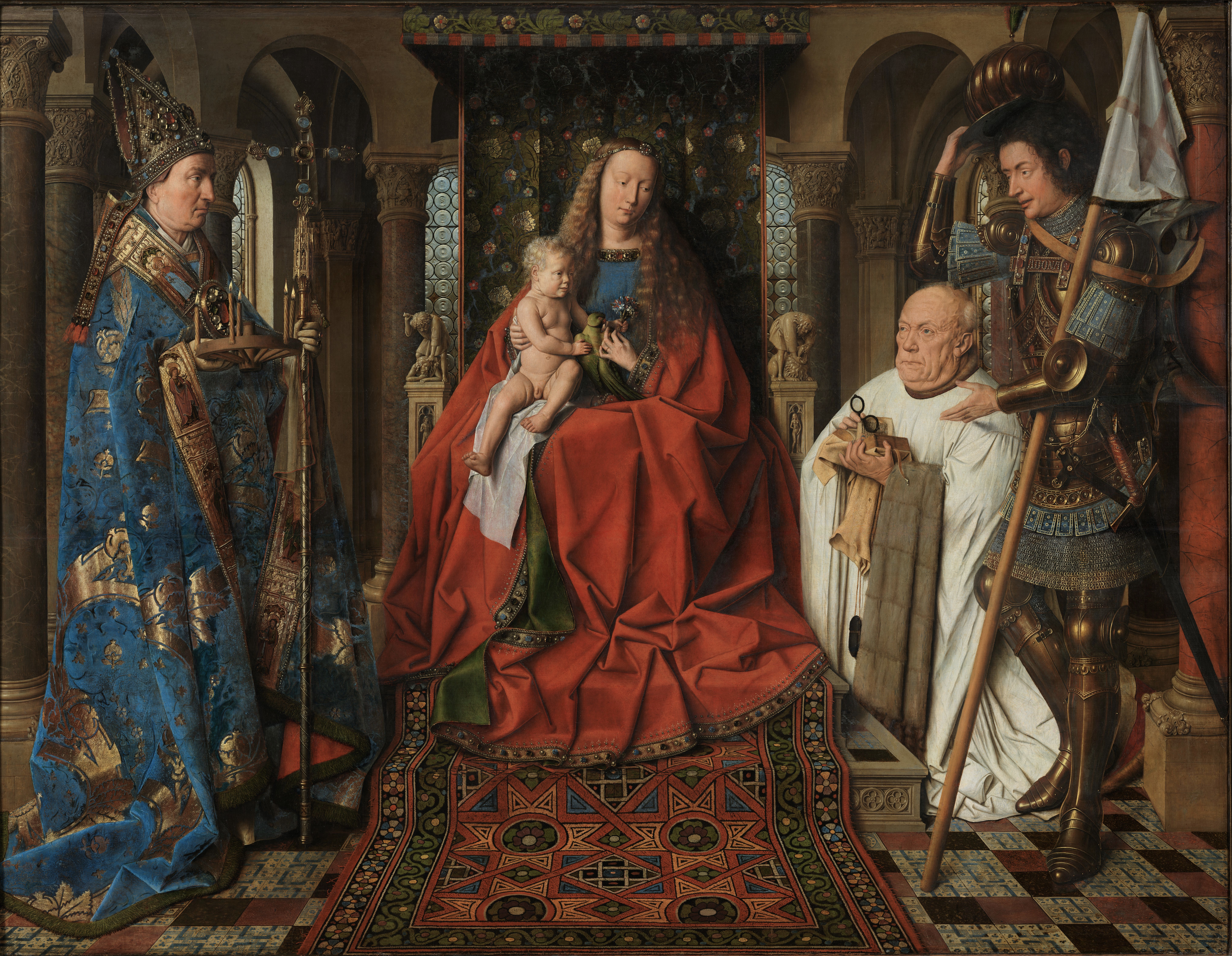
The Virgin and Child with Canon van der Paele, 1434–1436. Oil on wood, 141 x 176.5 cm (including frame), 122 x 157 cm (excluding frame). Groeningemuseum, Bruges.

The Virgin and Child with Canon van der Paele is a large oil-on-oak panel painting completed around 1434–1436 by the Early Netherlandish painter Jan van Eyck. It shows the painting's donor, Joris van der Paele, within an apparition of saints. The Virgin Mary is enthroned at the centre of the semicircular space, which most likely represents a church interior, with the Christ Child on her lap. St. Donatian stands to her right, Saint George—the donor's name saint—to her left. The panel was commissioned by van der Paele as an altarpiece. He was then a wealthy clergyman from Bruges, but elderly and gravely ill, and intended the work as his memorial.

The saints are identifiable from Latin inscriptions lining the borders of the imitation bronze frame, which is original. Van der Paele is identifiable from historical records. He is dressed in the finery of a medieval canon, including white surplice, as he piously reads from a book of hours. He is presented to Mary by Saint George, his name saint, who holds aloft his metal helmet in respect. Saint Donatian, dressed in brightly coloured vestments, stands to the left. The panel is noted for the finery of clothing, including exquisite representations of furs, silks and brocades, and the elaborate and detailed religious iconography. The Virgin's throne is decorated with carved representations of Adam and Eve, Cain and Abel, prefigurations of the Crucifixion and Resurrection of Jesus, and scenes from the Old Testament. The painting is lined with a series of inscriptions which comment on the saints, and include van Eyck's signature.

The van der Paele panel is widely considered one of van Eyck's most fully realised and ambitious works, and has been described as a "masterpiece of masterpieces".

== Commission ==
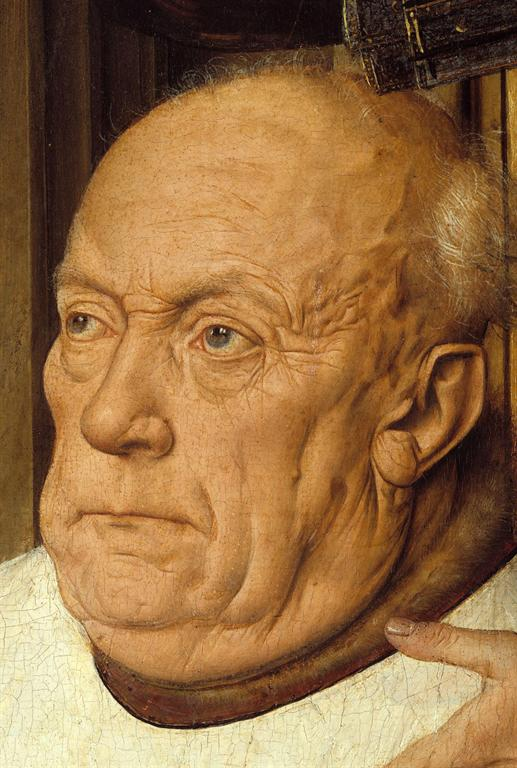
Canon van der Paele

Joris van der Paele is identifiable both from his resemblance and by the paternal and maternal coat of arms at the corners of each frame. He was born in Bruges around 1370, and spent his early career as a papal scribe in Rome before returning to his native city in 1425 as a wealthy man. He was appointed to a canonry of St. Donatian's collegiate church, a position which gave him income from the various parishes under his remit.

An illness around 1431 left van der Paele unable to fulfil the functions of his office, and led him to reflect upon his position as canon and on his mortality. In response he endowed a chaplaincy to the church and commissioned this work from van Eyck. The artist was at the height of his fame and in high demand, and this, along with the large size of the panel, meant that the commission took a lot longer to complete than was initially envisioned; two completion dates can be found on the frame, implying that the earlier date was aspirational and missed.

In return for the bequest, the church granted the canon a requiem mass, a daily mass and three votive masses a week, meant to intercede with the divine on his behalf. A second chaplaincy in 1443 centred on prayers for his family, and guaranteed that after his death, the requiem mass would end with readings of the Miserere mei and De profundis.

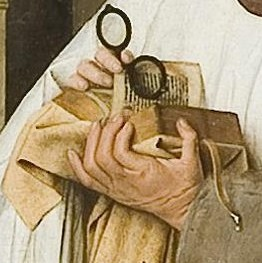
Detail of Van der Paele's prayer book and spectacles

Van der Paele may have kept the panel in his private chambers or as a church altar. He donated it to the church either in 1436 or on his death in 1443; it remained there until the church was demolished in 1779. Most likely the work was situated in the nave as an accompaniment to an altar for Saints Peter and Paul and used for memorial masses for van der Paele and his family. It was installed on the main altar after the Iconoclasm of 1566.

An inscription on the lower imitation frame refers to der Paele's benefaction: "Joris van der Paele, canon of this church, had this work made by painter Jan van Eyck. And he founded two chaplaincies here in the choir of the Lord. 1434. He only completed it in 1436, however."

== Description ==
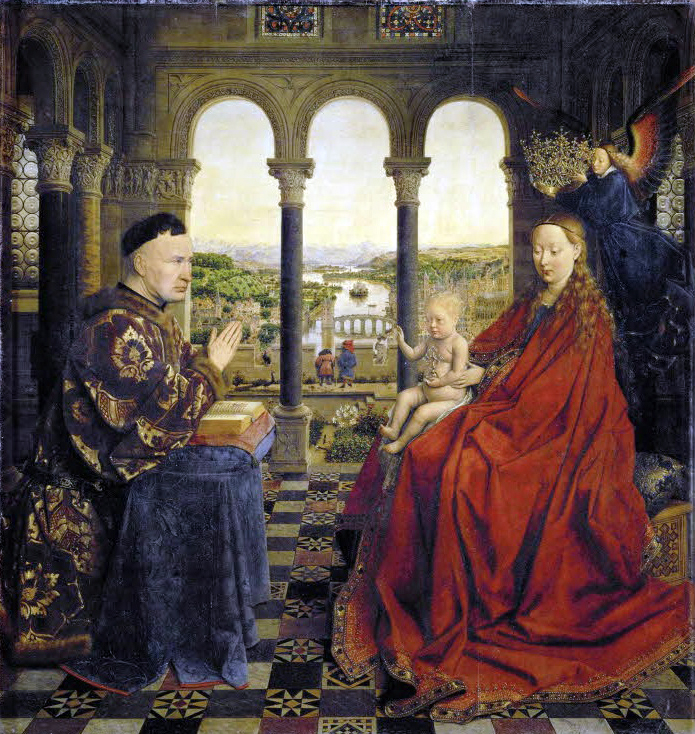
Madonna of Chancellor Rolin, around 1435, Musée du Louvre. Like van der Paele's panel, this work was created as an eventual memorial for the donor's burial church, in this case for Nicolas Rolin's family chapel in Notre Dame-du-Chastel in Autun.

The painting is set in a rounded church with ambulatories. Mary occupies the area where the altarpiece would usually be positioned. The panel has a sculptural look; the throne, windows, arches and hanging canvases borrow from the conventions of Romanesque architecture. The painting is, after the "Adoration of the Mystic Lamb" panel of the Ghent Altarpiece, van Eyck's second largest extant painting, and the only one in a horizontal framing. The Virgin and Child is characterised by its innovative use of illusionism and complex spatial composition. It retains its original oak frame, which contains several Latin inscriptions, including van Eyck's signature, the date of completion, the donor's name, and texts related to St. George and St. Donatian. The upper border contains phrases from the Book of Wisdom, comparing Mary to an "unspotted mirror".

The figures, the minutely detailed clothes, and the architecture of the room and windows are depicted with a high degree of realism. Van Eyck's mastery at handling oil can be seen in the differing breadths of brush strokes. The precision of the detail achieved is especially noticeable in the rendering of threads of St. Donatian's blue and golden embroidered cope and mitre, in the weave of the oriental carpet, and in the stubble and veins on van der Paele's aging face.

=== Figures ===
As with van Eyck's Madonna of Chancellor Rolin, the panel creates an intimate setting between the donor and Virgin. This is emphasised by the donor's physical proximity to the Virgin which, according to art historian Jeffrey Chipps Smith, "mentally and pictorially [breaches] the barriers between heaven and earth" and implies the "patrons are visually immortalized as meriting the Virgin and Child's personal attention." The intimacy is further enhanced by small details such as the overlap between the donor and Saint George, who casts a shadow on van der Paele and seems to have accidentally stepped on his surplice as he leans forward to introduce the canon to the Virgin.

==== St. Donatian ====
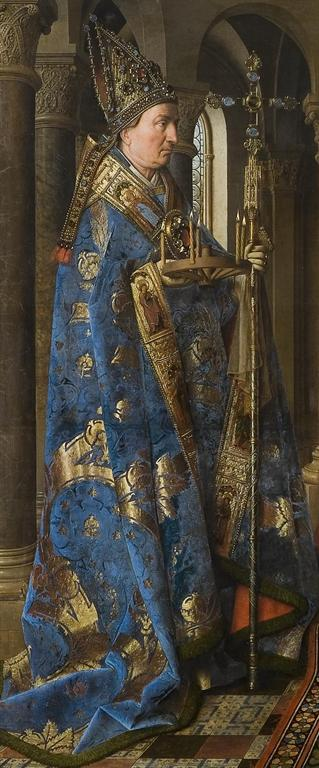
Detail of St. Donatian

St. Donatian is positioned to the left of the Virgin, the more significant position in heraldic terms, and reflective of his status as dedicatee of the cathedral the painting was made for, and of the city of Bruges. He wears a cope and mitre, vestments found in contemporary inventories of the church. His blue and gold brocade cope is embroidered with images of St. Paul and St. Peter. The colouring of his vestments is very similar to those of the Archangel in van Eyck's Dresden Triptych of 1437.

Donatian stands in front of a set of windows that are just outside the pictorial space. He holds a jewelled processional cross in his left hand, and a wheel containing five lit tapered candles in his right. The wheel is his usual attribute, and refers to an incident when he nearly drowned after being flung into the Tiber, but was saved after Pope Dionysius threw him a carriage wheel he was able to use as a float.

==== Virgin and Child ====
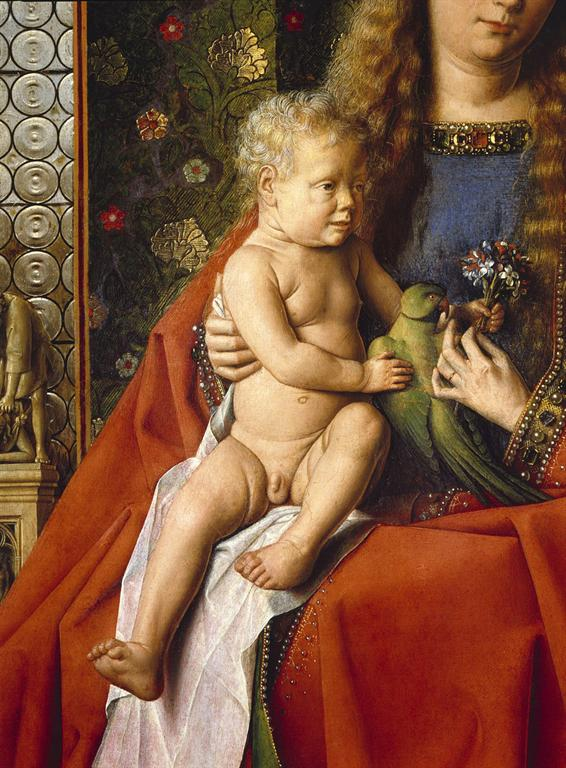
Detail of the Madonna and Child. Mary holds a flower between her fingers, while a parrot-like bird, perhaps a rose-ringed parakeet, rests on her lap.

The panel is one of the earliest known northern European sacra conversazione (the Virgin and Child shown with a group of saints in a relatively informal grouping) paintings. The Virgin sits on an elevated throne, situated beneath a minutely detailed and extravagantly decorated brocade baldachin containing white rose patterns, symbolising her purity. Given the church setting, Mary occupies the area where the altarpiece would usually be. The steps leading to the throne are covered with an oriental carpet. Her idealised facial type (and that of St. George) is very similar to the Virgin in van Eyck's Washington Annunciation.

Although the Madonna's throne is in the mid-ground, her head is level with the standing figures in the foreground, who are closer in perspective. The apse in which she sits adds to the illusion of depth and is an expanded area for her throne. A similar approach can be seen in the later Dresden Triptych, but that work contains a better handling of spatial depth; Mary's throne is moved back, and the donors and saints are relegated to wing panels. The figures in Canon van der Paele are within a more confined space, are somewhat cramped, but far more monumental.

The Child has curly blond hair and sits on a white cloth, animated and upright, at the side of the Virgin's lap. Like Mary, his body is shown frontally, his head in three quarters view. He reaches for what seems to be a parrot perched on her lap. At some point the Child's nudity was covered up; this overpaint was removed during a late 20th-century restoration. He is intended to represent both the host and Eucharist, common allusions in Early Netherlandish art and reflecting that the panel was intended for the celebration of Mass.

==== St. George ====
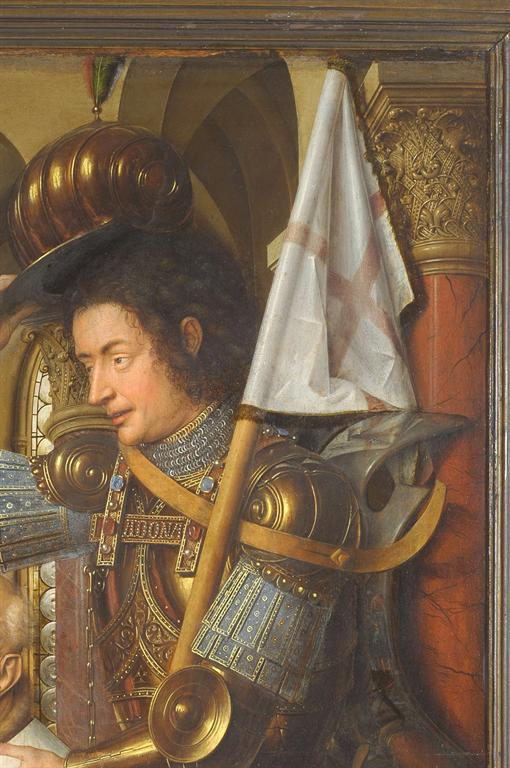
Detail showing St. George in armour

St. George stands in lavishly decorated armour, and appears relaxed and nonchalant, raising his helmet and left hand to introduce van der Paele. The saint was the donor's name saint and St. Donatian's Cathedral was built (c. 950) to house a relic of one of his arm bones. George's armour is similar to that of St. Michael in van Eyck's Dresden Triptych, while his steel shield resembles those in the Knights of Christ panel of the Ghent altarpiece.

Art historian Max Jakob Friedländer notes how St. George seems hesitant and unsure of himself in such a solemn and reserved setting. He has a very young face, and seems barely in his teens, with a gawky face, which according to Friedländer "forms a strange contrast to the aged, ponderous canon". George is unsteady on his feet, and appears to struggle with having to raise his helmet while simultaneously presenting the donor, and "this seems to embarrass him". George is the only figure whose feet are exposed. The uncertain manner in which he gestures to the Virgin gives the impression of a shy and uncertain nature; and he raises his helmet in a hesitant manner. Friedländer observes that George's head is slightly inclined, his face "twisted into an empty smile".

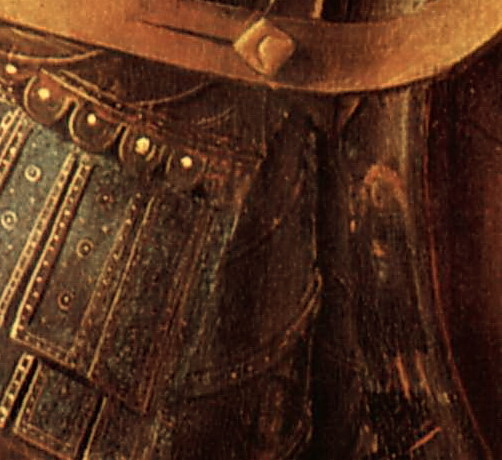
Detail showing the presumed self-portrait with van Eyck in greenish blue clothing and a red chaperon

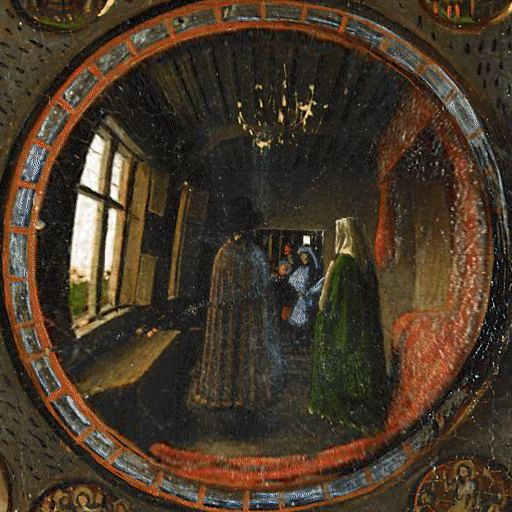
Detail showing van Eyck's presumed self-portrait in the mirror reflection of his Arnolfini Portrait. National Gallery, London

The Virgin and Child can be seen in the reflection of George's helmet. Van Eyck alludes to his own artistry by including his self portrait as a reflection on the knight's shield. The artist depicts himself standing at his easel, in a manner that strongly resembles the self-portrait reflected in the mirror in his Arnolfini Portrait.

In both that works he shows himself wearing a red turban similar to that seen in the 1433 possible self-portrait Portrait of a Man.

==== Joris van der Paele ====
The painting marks a departure from conventional and contemporary European epitaphs by placing the saints and mortal donor within the same pictorial space. Van der Paele kneels to the right of the Virgin and Child and seems a somewhat distracted and absent-minded figure. This is intentional, an indication that he is, in the words of art historian Bret Rothstein, "disconnected from the perceptible world", and fully absorbed in the spiritual realm. This notion is reinforced by his glasses which, although they imply education, wealth and learning, also allude to fallibility of the human, earthly senses. In keeping with the conventions of late medieval art, van der Paele does not look directly at any of the heavenly figures, but stares into the middle distance, observing social and spiritual decorum.

Van Eyck does not shy from showing the physical effects of the canon's illness, including worn, crevassed and tired skin, weak vision, enlarged temporal arteries and swollen fingers. The awkwardness with which van der Paele clutches his breviary suggests weakness in his left arm; van de Paele probably suffered acute arm and shoulder pain, borne out by early 1430s church records documenting that he was excused from morning duties, and absent all day by 1434. His condition has been diagnosed by modern doctors as possibly polymyalgia rheumatica and temporal arteritis. A restoration of the painting in 1934 by Jef Van der Verken painted over a lesion on the lower lip of van der Paele which was visible in older black-and-white photographs taken by Fierens Gevaert. The art critic and dermatologist Jules Desneux diagnosed it as a potentially malignant plaque keratosique.

== Iconography ==
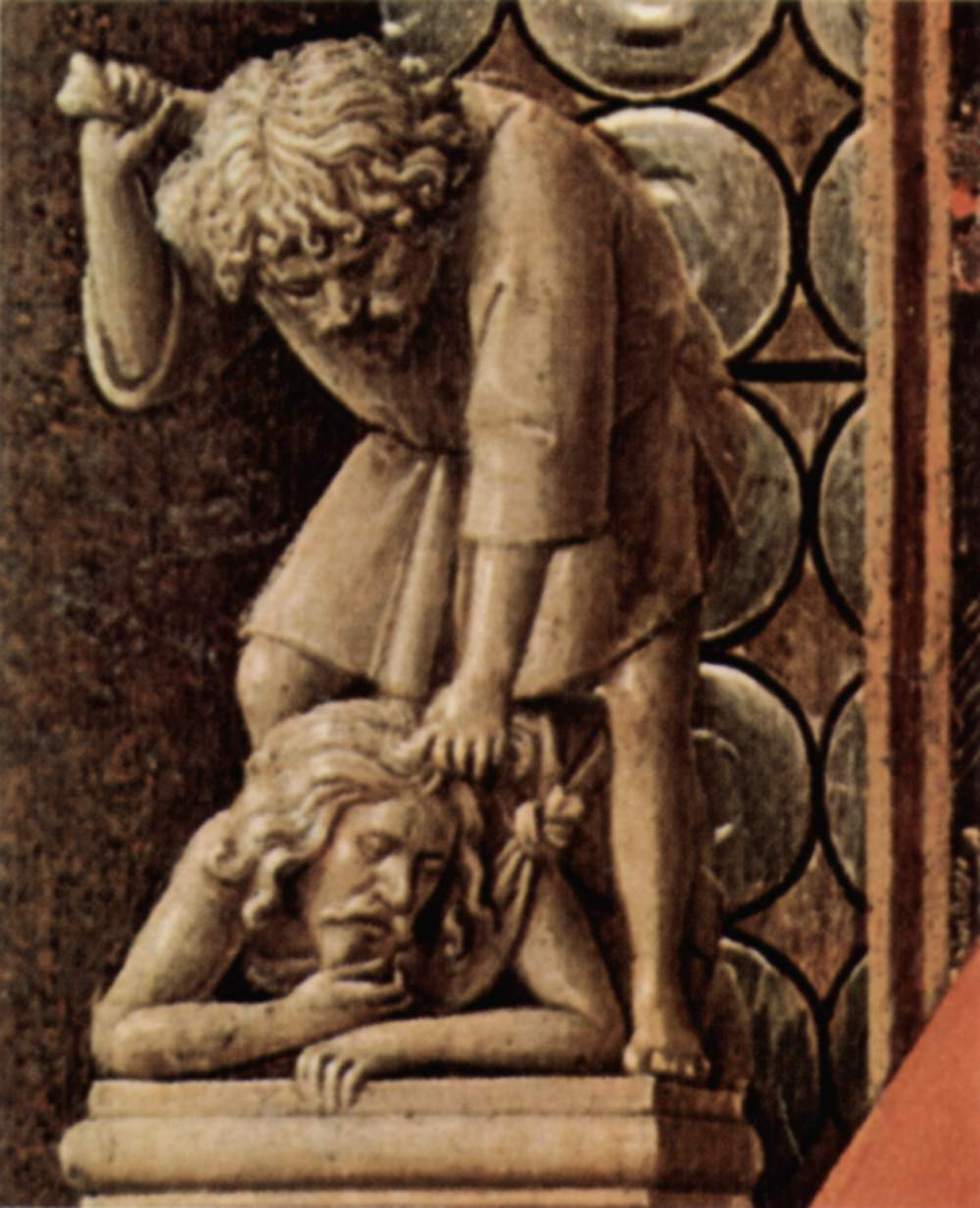
Carving on the capital to Mary's left: Cain beats Abel to death with a club

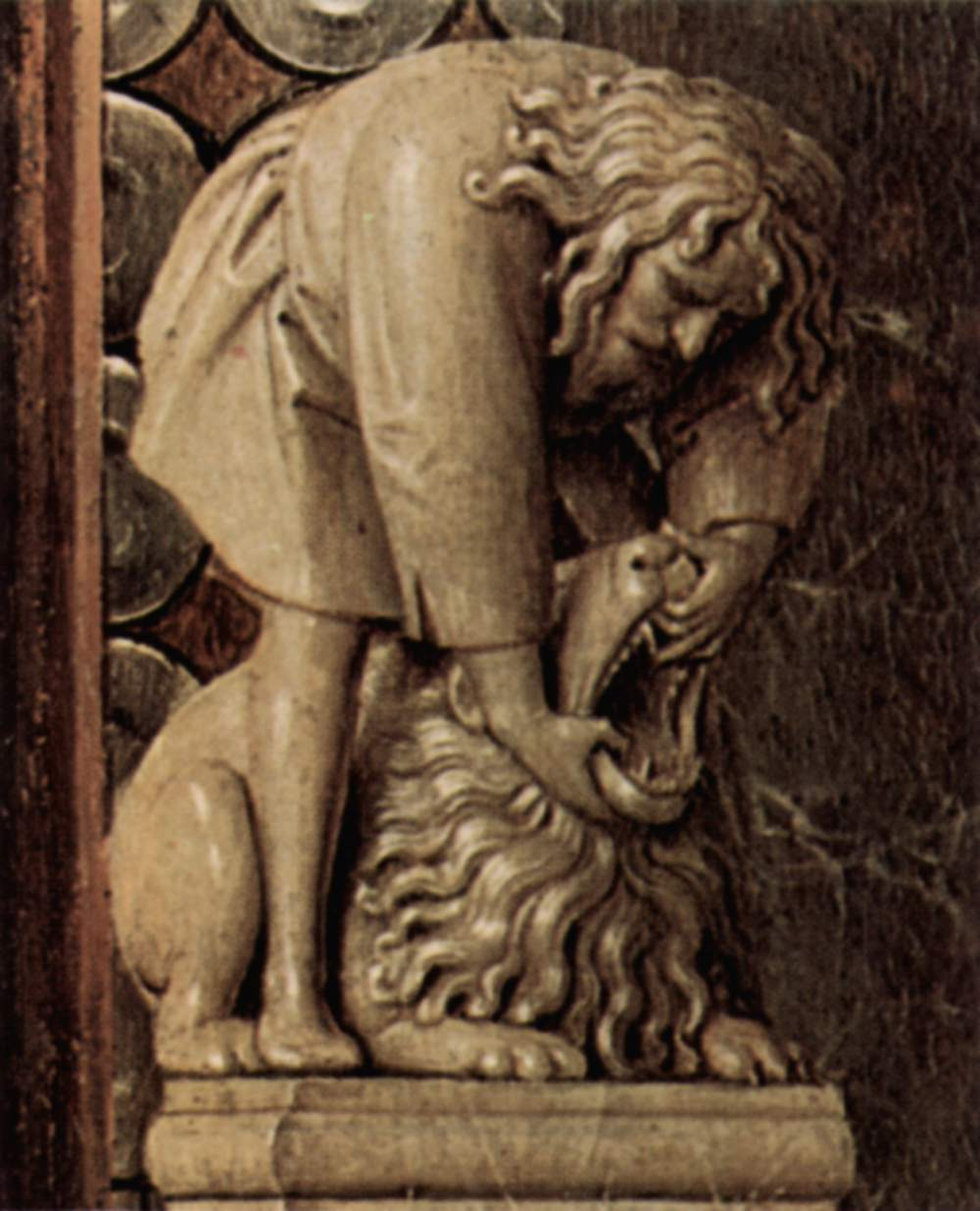
The capital to Mary's right: Samson opening the Lion's jaws

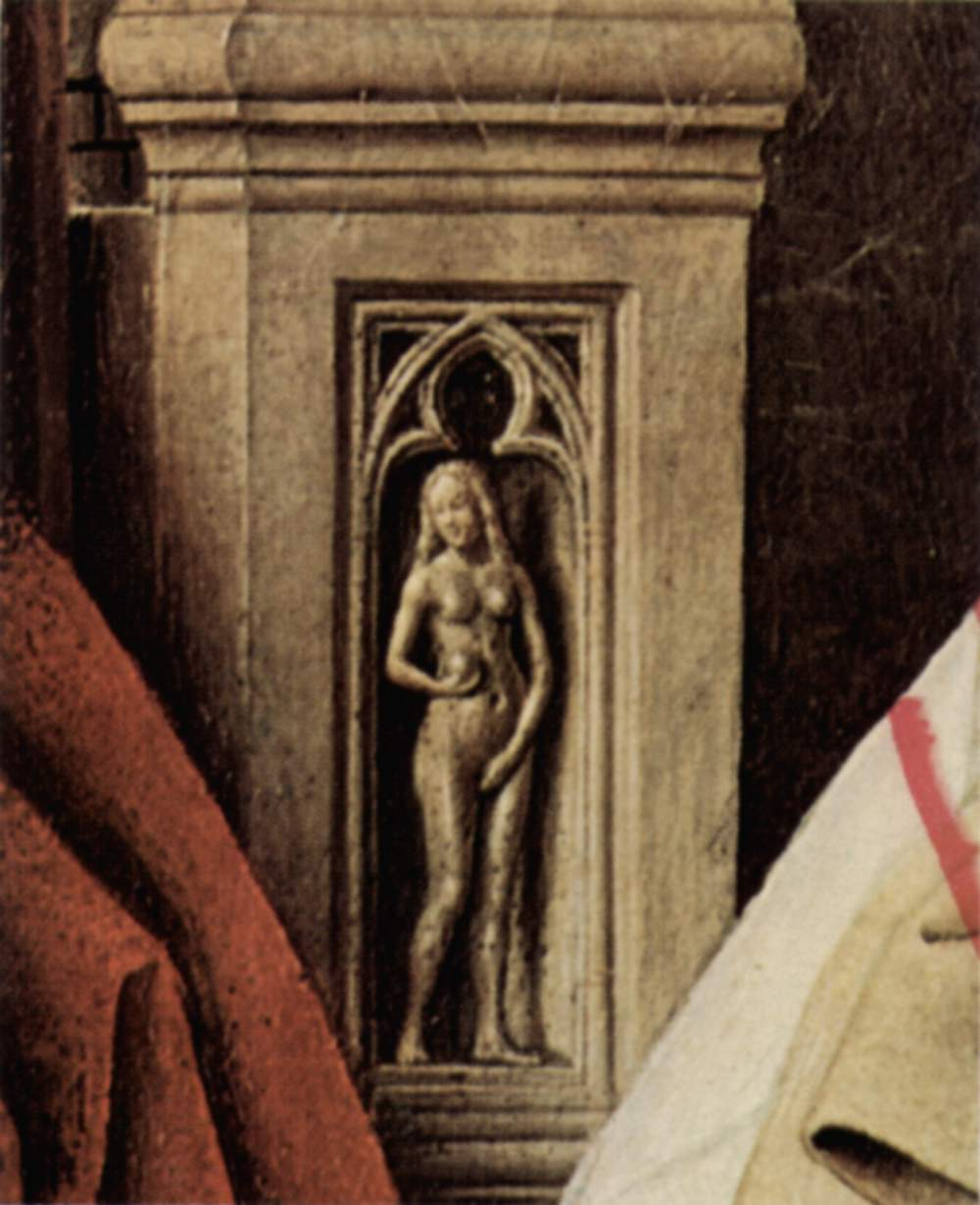
Imitation carving of Eve on the arm of the throne

Virgin and Child is rich with seamlessly woven iconography. Broadly, the elements on the left, including the imitation carvings, reference Christ's death, and those on the right his Resurrection. The painting contains examples of van Eyck's habit of presenting the viewer with what art historian Craig Harbison describes as "a transfigured view of visible reality", via the placement of small, unobtrusive, details which "illustrated not earthly existence but what [van Eyck] considered supernatural truth. They would have been easy to discern for a medieval viewer".

The figures are in a church, surrounded by an arcade of semi-circular arches, which suggests it might be a choir. The scene seems to be illuminated from invisible windows, with light spilling from the left foreground and the leaded windows behind the Virgin's throne. Mary's throne is placed where the altar would normally be positioned. The Child's white cloth is draped over Mary's red robe, which may represent veiled host during celebration of the Eucharist; a reference to Christ's death and resurrection.

The churches in van Eyck's work are not based on historical buildings, but were amalgams of different buildings and fictitious spaces. The church might resemble St. Donatian's, which has since been demolished; it seems to share similarities with the Church of the Holy Sepulchre in Jerusalem, with elements of Romanesque architecture. Van Eyck's paintings are often spatially ambiguous; the more the viewer looks at them the more questions are raised. Reflecting a consensus among art historians, Ward interprets the contradictions as "either curiously incoherent or deliberately designed to enact a complex symbolic message." Mary holds a stem that appears to grow from the parrot's feathers, culminating in a bouquet of red, white and blue flowers. A parrot was sometimes used as an emblem for the Virgin, but its juxtaposition with the plant is incongruous. The parrot and plant emphasise the floral background, symbolising the Garden of Eden, accented by the figures of Adam of Eve. The flowers' colours represent purity, love and humility; its petals are a symbol of the cross and Christ's sacrifice. The narrative of original sin, the expulsion and redemption is thus captured in a single realistic device.

The carved representations of Adam and Eve appear on the uprights of the throne. The capitals on the arms of the throne show Cain beating Abel to death with a club to Mary's left, and Samson opening the lion's jaws to her left. The carvings on the architectural capitals depict Old Testament scenes, including the meeting of Abraham and Melchizedek and the Sacrifice of Isaac.

== Frame and inscriptions ==
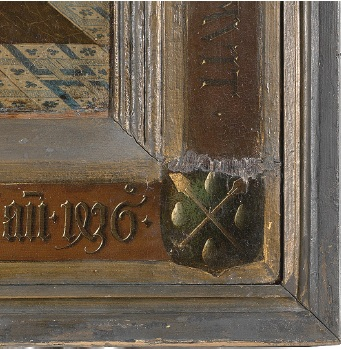
Detail showing the lower right corner of the frame, with Jan's inscribed completion date of 1436, and the donor's crest of arms. A paint gap reveals plant fibres to the right of the join.

The panel is made from six horizontal boards linked by butt joins reinforced with a cylindrical rod, with the joins glued with plant fibres. The reverse is not painted, indicating it was intended to hang against a wall. The frame comprises a main frame nailed and screwed at the side to two outer parts. The borders do not show signs of having hinges, indicating that the work was meant as a stand-alone panel, and not as part of a triptych. The corners are assembled with mortise and tenon. Each corner is reinforced by two pegs. The boards were originally painted a uniform brown, and were degraded by gloss and overprint over the centuries. Following a series of restorations, mainly by Jef Van der Veken in 1933-34 and Edmond Florens in 1977, they are in good condition. The inscriptions were placed on flat strips between the mouldings.

The frame is richly inscribed, with van Eyck's signature, the coats of arms of both Van der Paele's paternal and maternal families, lettering identifying each of the two attendant saints, and a passage praising the Virgin. The inscriptions are painted in an illusionistic manner. Those on the lower border appear to be in raised cast brass lettering, those on the order borders appear to have been cut into the frame's timber.

The inscription on the frame beside St. Donatian reads "SOLO P[AR]TV NON[VS] FR[ATRV]M. MERS[VS] REDIT[VR]. RENAT[VS] ARCH[IEPISC]O[PVS] PR[I]M[VS]. REMIS CONSTITVITVR. QVI NV[N]C DEO FRVITVR." (He was the youngest of nine brothers; thrown into the water, he returned to life and became the first archbishop of Reims. He enjoys now the glory of God). Those beside St. George read "NATUS CAPADOCIA. X[PIST]O MILITAVIT. MVNDI FVG[I]E[N]S OTIA. CESU TRIVMPHAVIT. HIC DRACONEM STRAVIT" (Born in Cappadocia, he was soldier of Christ. Fleeing the idleness / pleasures of the world, he triumphed over death and vanquished the dragon. The letters ADONAI are inscribed on George's breastplate.

Mary's robe is embroidered with Latin text, taken from the Wisdom of Solomon 7:29: Est enim haec speciosior sole et super omnem stellarum dispositionem. Luci conparata invenitur prior ("For she is more beautiful than the sun, and excels every constellation of the stars. Compared with the light she is found to be superior"). Van Eyck used a similar device in his Berlin Madonna in the Church, completed c. 1438–40.

Lower border. "HOC OP ' FECIT MAGR GEORGI' DE PALA HUI' CANONI P IOHANNE DE EYCK PICTORE . ET FUNDAVIT HIC DUAS CAPELLIAS DE I GMO CHORI DOMINI . M . CCCC . XXXIIIJ . PL AU . 1436."

== Provenance and influence ==
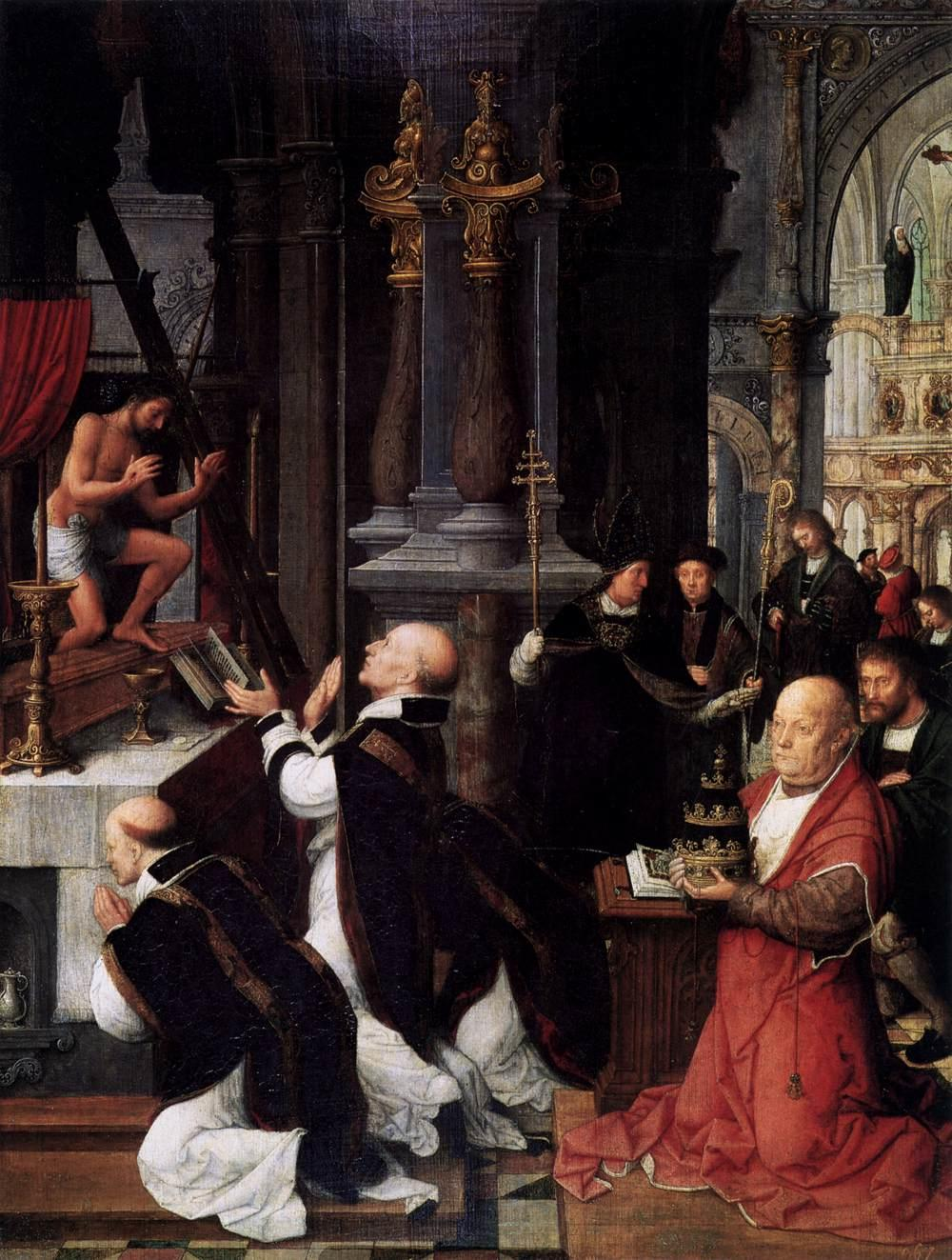
Adriaen Isenbrandt, Mass of St Gregory, 1550, Museo del Prado

The painting remained in the church for which it was painted until after the French Revolution, and was one of the well-known artistic attractions of Bruges for visitors. It was presumably one of the paintings in the church praised by Albrecht Dürer in his diary in 1521. In 1547 Mary of Hungary, Governess of the Spanish Netherlands, wanted to buy it for her collection, but the chapter politely refused, saying this would create "moans, protests, uproar and complaints" from the people. During a spate of Calvinist mob iconoclasm in 1578 it was moved to a private house for safety, and by 1600 it had been given a setting with side wings and now formed the main altarpiece, replacing a destroyed metalwork retable of the 14th century. But by perhaps 1628 it was in the sacristy and from 1643 above a new side altar.

The painting was acquired, along with many other Netherlandish and Flemish works, by the Musée du Louvre in 1794, during the plundering of the estates of aristocrats in the years of the French revolutionary army's occupation of the Southern Netherlands. Other works acquired in this way include the centre panels of van Eyck's Ghent Altarpiece, Hans Memling's Moreel Triptych and Gerard David's Judgement of Cambyses. Many, including the van der Paele panel, were returned to Bruges in 1816. The return of the panel became entangled in a dispute over control and ownership between the French and Dutch-speaking officials of Bruges, but it was entrusted to the Flemish Academy of Bruges. In 1855 it became part of the municipal collections, at first at the Bogaerdeschool Museum, until it became part of the collection of the Groeningemuseum in 1930.

The painting was widely influential in the 15th and 16th centuries. The set piece of Van Eyck's enthroned Virgin, with a distracted Child on her lap was both widely copied, and became a standard for the following 150 years. There are numerous surviving contemporary close and free copies, the most significant of which is the Royal Museum of Fine Arts Antwerp. Adriaen Isenbrandt included van der Paele's head in his Mass of St Gregory of 1550.

Both panel and frame are in good condition. That the panel retains its original frame makes it especially interesting to art historians, apart from its aesthetic qualities. It has suffered little paint loss, board cracking, or other damage, and has been cleaned several times since it came into the possession of the Groeningemuseum.

== See also ==
- List of works by Jan van Eyck
