= Stealing the Mystic Lamb =

2010 book by Noah Charney

- Author: Noah Charney
- Publisher: PublicAffairs
- Publication date: 2010

Stealing the Mystic Lamb: The True Story of the World's Most Coveted Masterpiece is a non-fiction book by art historian Noah Charney. The book was published in 2010 by PublicAffairs. It tells the story of The Ghent Altarpiece (also known as The Adoration of the Mystic Lamb, or simply The Mystic Lamb), a monumental oil painting by the Flemish master Jan van Eyck, currently on display in the cathedral of Saint Bavo, in the city of Ghent. The work is arguably the most influential painting in history, and it is also the most frequently stolen artwork of all-time. Charney's book tells the story of the artwork and the many crimes and mysteries of which it was the victim since its completion in 1432.

== Critical reaction ==
Charney's book received much critical praise, including the following review from Kirkus Reviews (15 July 2010):

"Charney (Art History/American Univ. of Rome; The Art Thief, 2007, etc.) unsnarls the tangled history of Jan van Eyck's 15th-century The Ghent Altarpiece (a.k.a. The Mystic Lamb), "the most desired and victimized object of all time." With a novelist's sense of structure and tension, the author adds an easy familiarity with the techniques of oil painting and with the intertwining vines of art and political and religious history. He begins near the end of World War II. As the Reich's military fortunes crumbled, the Allies scrambled to find where the Nazis concealed their tens of thousands of stolen artworks, many slated for Hitler's proposed "super museum." Among them was the Altarpiece. Charney pauses to describe the large work, which comprises 20 individual painted panels, hinged together. Art historians admire it not just for its supreme craftsmanship—described clearly by the author—but also for its historical significance as the world's first major oil painting. Charney also lists a number of "firsts" that the work represents (e.g., the first to use directed spotlighting) and sketches the biography of van Eyck, which makes Shakespeare's seem richly detailed by comparison. Commissioned to create the altarpiece for the Saint Bavo Cathedral in Ghent, Belgium, van Eyck took some six years to complete it. As religious and political strife waxed and waned, the painting was always in danger. The Calvinists didn't like it (the Catholics promptly hid it); Napoleon, perhaps history's greatest art thief, craved it; a cathedral fire threatened it; the Germans came for it in World War I and again in World War II. Even now, one panel remains at large, though some argue that the replacement copy is actually the original. A brisk tale of true-life heroism, villainy, artistry and passion."

== Author ==
Noah Charney holds advanced degrees in art history from The Courtauld Institute and Cambridge University. He is the founding director of ARCA, the Association for Research into Crimes against Art, a non-profit think tank and consultancy group on issues in art crime (www.artcrime.info). His work in the field of art crime has been praised in such forums as The New York Times Magazine, Time Magazine, The Wall Street Journal, BBC Radio, National Public Radio, El Pais, Vogue, Vanity Fair, and Tatler among others. He has appeared on radio and television, including ITV, CNBC, and MSNBC and he is in constant demand as a lecturer. Having recently taught at Yale University, Charney is now Adjunct Professor of Art History at the American University of Rome. Charney is the author of numerous articles and a novel, The Art Thief (Atria 2007), which is currently translated into fourteen languages and is a best-seller in four countries. He is the editor of an academic essay collection entitled Art & Crime: Exploring the Dark Side of the Art World, published by Praeger in 2009 and the Museum Time series of guides to museums in Spain, published by geoPlaneta in 2010. He lives in Italy and lectures internationally in the subjects of art history and art crime.
