= Donatian of Reims =

French saint and bishop

Saint Donatian of Reims
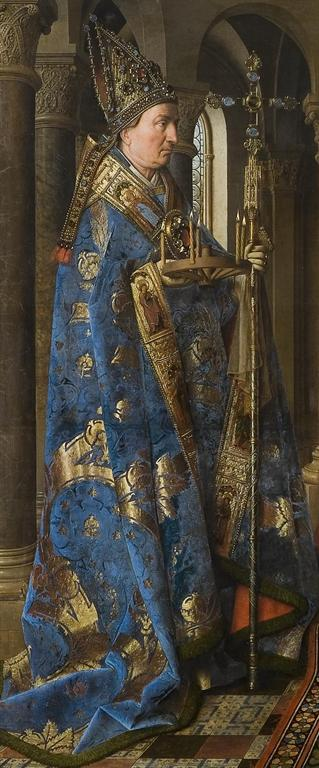
- Detail of St. Donatian, from Jan van Eyck's Virgin and Child with Canon van der Paele (1436)

Donatien of Reims (also known as Donatien or Donat) was a 4th-century French saint and the 8th Bishop of Reims.

He died in AD 389, and in AD 863 the count of Flanders Baldwin I transferred his relics to the Church Saint-Agricol de Reims at Bruges, where his cult is still active. He is venerated as a saint and his feast day is celebrated on 14 October. In Christian iconography, Donatian is pictured holding a water wheel or bearing candles.

== Legend ==
A legend has it that he was thrown as a child into a river, where a holy man took five candles and placed them on a water wheel which showed where the child had gone, and he was able to recover the child.
