= Blokland, South Holland =

Blokland
- Hamlet
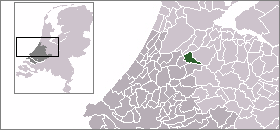

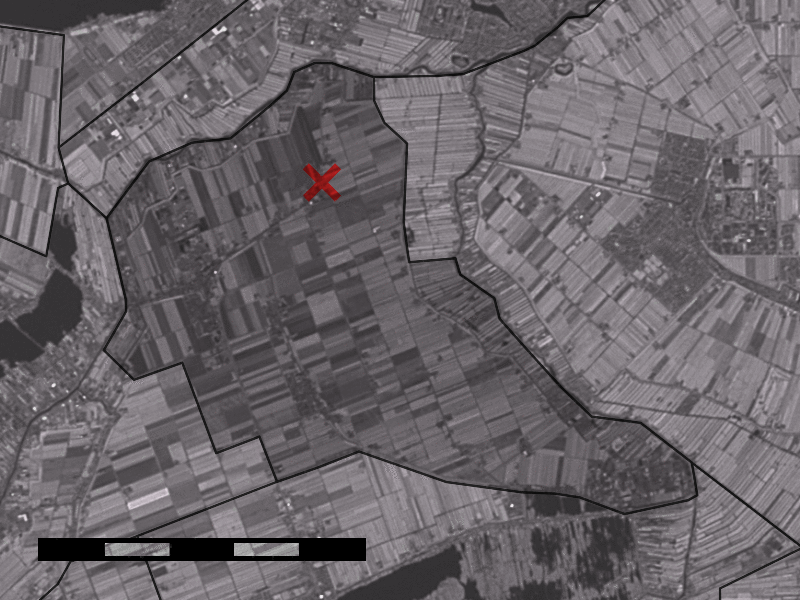
- Blokland in the municipality of Liemeer.
- Coordinates: 52°11′32″N 4°46′24″E
- Country: Netherlands
- Province: South Holland
- Municipality: Nieuwkoop
- Time zone: UTC+1 (CET)
  - Summer (DST): UTC+2 (CEST)

Blokland is a hamlet in the Dutch province of South Holland. It is a part of the municipality of Liemeer, and lies about 12 km northeast of Alphen aan den Rijn.

The area Blokland, in which the hamlet is located, used to be part of Uithoorn, but became part of Mijdrecht in 1811. The eastern half of the area, Polder Blokland, still is part of the municipality of De Ronde Venen in the province of Utrecht (which includes Mijdrecht); the western half of the area, part of Polder Zevenhoven, is part of Liemeer in the province South Holland. Confusingly, the hamlet itself lies in Polder Zevenhoven; the houses in Polder Blokland are part of the hamlets Kromme Mijdrecht and De Hoef.
