= Ince Hall Madonna =

Painting imitating a work of Jan van Eyck

Virgin and Child Reading
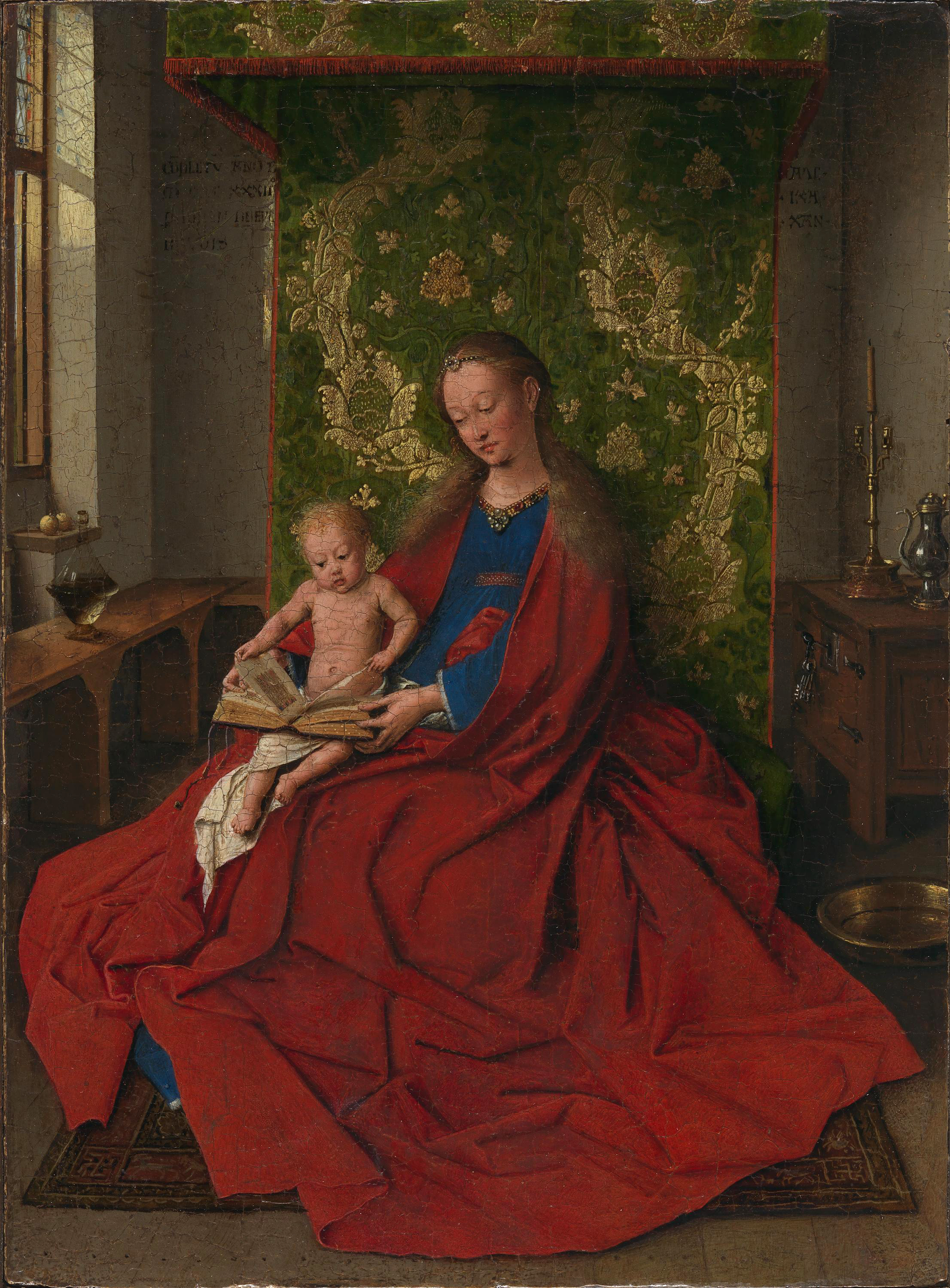
- Artist: after Jan van Eyck
- Year: mid-to-late 15th century
- Type: Oil on panel
- Dimensions: 26.3 cm × 19.4 cm (10.4 in × 7.6 in)
- Location: National Gallery of Victoria; Melbourne

The Virgin and Child Reading is an oil painting of uncertain date. It is a mid-to-late 15th century imitation of the work of the Early Netherlandish master Jan van Eyck, possibly after a now-lost original painting by him from 1433 - another copy of the same work is now in the Colegiata church in Covarrubias, Spain. It is first documented in 1619, when it was in Sicily and then re-appeared in Charles Blundell's collection at Ince Blundell Hall near Liverpool early in the 19th century, meaning it is sometimes known as the Ince Hall Madonna. George Frederick Zink restored it there in 1922. It was acquired from the Weld-Blundell family by the National Gallery of Victoria (NGV) in Melbourne in 1922 using funds from the Felton Bequest.

The Virgin Mary is depicted wearing a red cloak, with a baldachin behind her. Baby Jesus is seated on her lap; they are both holding and reading a book together. The book could possibly be the Magnificat, as per traditional representations of the Madonna.

The inscription on the wall at top left reads: "COPLETV ANO D M CCCC XXXIIJ P IOHEM DE EYC BRVGIS". This translates as "Completed in the Year of Our Lord 1433 by Jan van Eyck, Bruges". To the right of the tapestry is van Eyck's personal motto in Greek letters "ALC IXH XAN" ("As I Can"), playing on the similarity between his surname and 'IXH' (an approximate transliteration of "ich" or "I" into ancient Greek characters).

== Attribution ==
On its acquisition by the NGV in 1922 it was held to be an autograph work by van Eyck. However, laboratory tests in 1958 by P. Coremans, A. Philippot and R.V. Sneyers at the IRPA in Belgium, an infrared spectroscopy study in 2003 and other features have all contributed to its de-attribution. For example, the spatial relationship between the two figures and the surrounding furniture is only vaguely hinted at and the work's grasp of perspective and depth is not as developed as in the autograph Lucca Madonna and Rolin Madonna. The letter formation in the signature does not correspond to the confirmed signatures on the Virgin and Child with Canon van der Paele or the Dresden Triptych. The signature also appears in the scene itself, rather than van Eyck's more usual practice of signing on the frame - some art historians argue that the work was originally in just such a signed frame but that after that frame was lost it was added to the work itself by an unknown hand.

== Bibliography ==
- (in French) Valentin Denis, Van Eyck, Nathan, 1982, page 81
- (in German) Otto Pächt: Van Eyck. Die Begründer der niederländischen Malerei. Herausgegeben von Maria Schmidt-Dengler. Prestel, München 1989, ISBN 3-7913-1033-X, S. 87–88.
