= Vrouwenakker =

- Hamlet
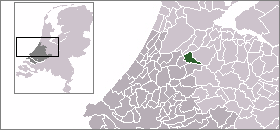

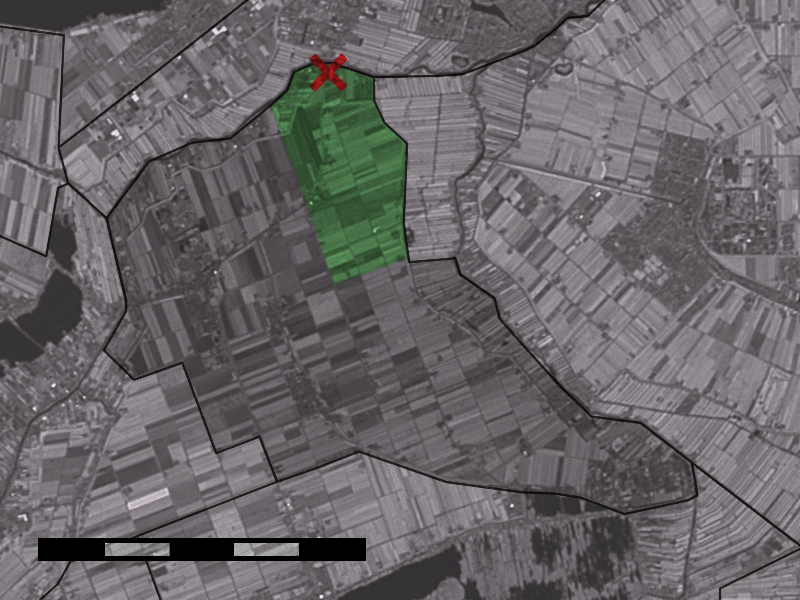
- The village (dark red) and the statistical district (light green) of Vrouwenakker in the former municipality of Liemeer.
- Coordinates: 52°13′41″N 4°47′2″E
- Country: Netherlands
- Province: South Holland
- Municipality: Nieuwkoop

Population (2007)
  - Total: 310
- Time zone: UTC+1 (CET)
  - Summer (DST): UTC+2 (CEST)

Vrouwenakker is a village in the Netherlands, about 12 km southeast of Hoofddorp. It lies largely in the municipality of Nieuwkoop (formerly Liemeer), in the province of South Holland, but a small part lies in the municipality of Uithoorn, in North Holland. Until 1989 Vrouwenakker was part of the municipality of Mijdrecht, but was then rearranged into the municipality of Liemeer after the amalgamation of Mijdrecht and surrounding municipalities.

The statistical area "Vrouwenakker", which contains the part of the village in South Holland and the surrounding countryside, has a population of around 310.
