= Aardam (disambiguation) =

Aardam is a hamlet of the town Ter Aar, in the municipality of Nieuwkoop, Netherlands.

It may also refer to:

- Aar Dam, a dam on the Aar river in Germany
- Ott Aardam (born 1980), Estonian stage, television, and film actor
