= Liemeer =

Former municipality of the Netherlands

Coordinates: 52°12′N 4°47′E

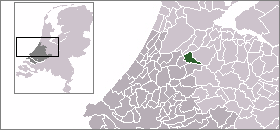
Location of Liemeer, until Jan. 2007.

Liemeer (Dutch: [liˈmeːr]) is a former municipality in the western Netherlands, in the province of South Holland. It was merged into the municipality of Nieuwkoop on January 1, 2007.

The municipality covered an area of 30.98 km² of which 0.76 km² is water. Its population was 6962 in November 2006. Liemeer consisted of the communities of Nieuwveen, Noorden, Vrouwenakker, and Zevenhoven.

The former municipality of Liemeer was established as a renaming of Nieuwveen in 1994.
