= Papenveer =

Paperveer
- Hamlet
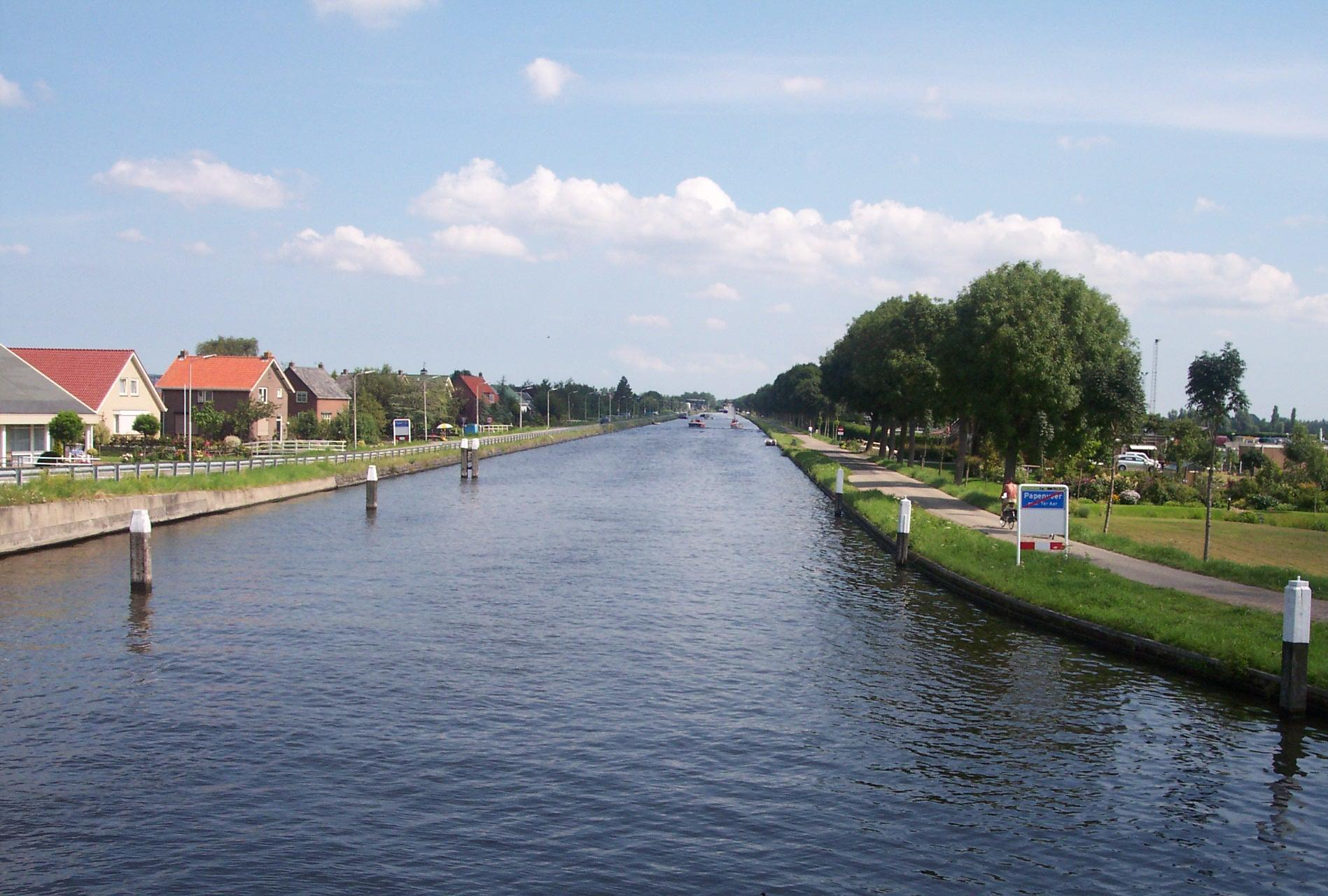
- Interactive map of Paperveer
- Coordinates: 52°11′02″N 4°43′30″E
- Country: Netherlands
- Province: South Holland
- Municipality: Nieuwkoop

Population (2007)
  - Total: 1,180

Papenveer is a small village in the Dutch province of South Holland. It is located in the municipality of Nieuwkoop, 2 km north of Ter Aar.

The name "Papenveer" means "Catholics' ferry". When the Catholic Church in Korteraar closed in 1822, churchgoers had to cross the river De Aar to go to the church in Langeraar. A ferry was opened that was free for Catholics; everyone else had to pay. The village of Papenveer grew around this ferry. Currently, there is a bridge, the Papenveerse Brug, at the location of the former ferry.
