= Willem van Eijk =

Dutch serial killer

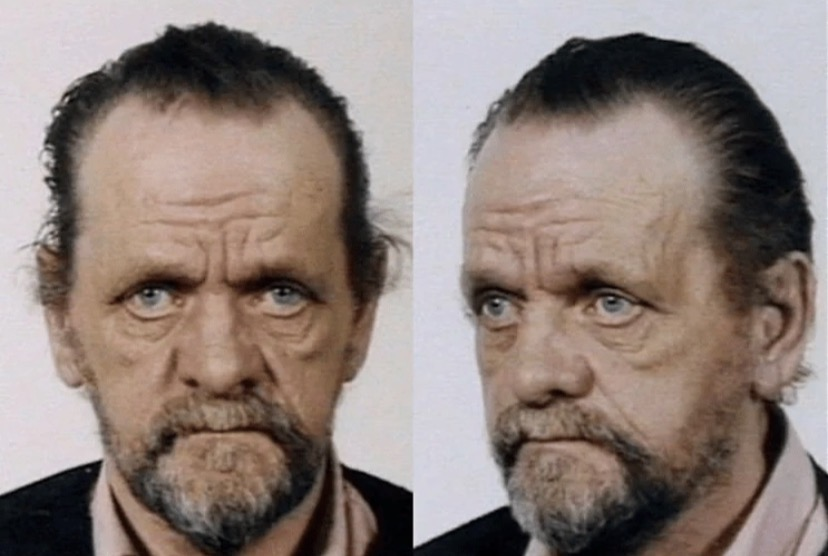
- Born: Willem van Eijk; 13 August 1941; Korteraar (Nieuwkoop)
- Died: 19 June 2019 (aged 77); Vught, Netherlands
- Penalty: Life imprisonment

Details
- Victims: 5–8
- Span of crimes: 1971–2001
- Country: Kingdom of the Netherlands
- Date apprehended: 12 November 2001

Willem van Eijk (13 August 1941 – 19 June 2019) was a convicted Dutch serial killer known as "Het Beest van Harkstede" (The Beast of Harkstede). He was convicted twice for a total of five murders.

== Youth ==
Willem van Eijk was born in 1941 in the small village of Korteraar, South Holland, then under the German occupation of the Netherlands. He grew up in a working-class family. His parents had a lot of kids (8 including Willem), which wasn't unusual at the time. During his time at an elementary school in Ter Aar, he was an outcast and referred to as "Gekke Willempie" (Dutch for "crazy little Willem"), something he later used to justify his outrageous actions. During this time of extreme bullying, van Eijk started to collect morbid items, such as dead insects and dried frogs. He did not enjoy studying and refused to do so. He soon gained notoriety in his home village for his cruelty towards animals; he would enjoy torturing dogs, drowning cats and kicking ducks until they died. When he was 8 years old his brothers described him as 'evil personified'. Van Eijk committed petty crimes for a living as his (high) school career did not go well. During this time he started to dream about raping and killing women.

== Victims ==
- Cora Mantel – In 1971 he picked up the 15-year-old Cora Mantel from Uithoorn. Having missed her bus ride home after meeting with her boyfriend in Amsterdam, van Eijk found her hitchhiking. He strangled her with her own shawl and raped her, before dumping her body in a ditch near Uithoorn. Later on, he would explain he felt regretful about his actions because 'she had only lived for such a short period of time,' 'but, I finally had my chance and I took it'. He said, giving more light to his intense desires and dreams to murder and rape women. Her body was found on 22 June 1971.
- Aaltje van der Plaat – On 19 August 1974 the lifeless body of 43-year-old Aaltje van der Plaat was found near a road inside a cornfield. She had suffered multiple stab wounds, her stomach was ripped open, and her left nipple was cut off. Van Eijk lived in a small, white houseboat on which he had written the words De Vrijheid (the freedom), in dripping blood-red paint. Several witnesses had seen van Eijk riding his moped on the same evening and in the same area where the body was found. The police arrested van Eijk, and he immediately confessed to the murder of Aaltje, and soon thereafter to the murder of Cora.

In 1975, van Eijk was sentenced to 18 years imprisonment and TBS. The details of the murders, as revealed during the trial, were so astonishing to the public that several judiciary guards vomited. Psychiatric reports explained that van Eijk had severe childhood trauma as a result of (mostly female) bullying and rejection by women. During his therapy at the Van Mesdagkliniek in Groningen, psychiatrists speculated that his deviant behaviour was the result of brain damage sustained during his birth. However, van Eijk refused any investigations. He was combative about denying treatment out of 'fear of psychic disintegration'. He was seen as one of the hardest patients the clinic had ever had. In 1980, while still in remand, he married his pen-pal Adri. In 1990 he was released and together with Adri, moved into a house in Harkstede. Psychiatrists believed that his relationship with Adri would prevent him from re-offending, but warned that subsequent female rejections could trigger a relapse. The relationship turned out to be a downward spiral for van Eijk.

- Antoanella Bertholda (Michelle) Fatol – In November 1993 in a ditch near the village Enumatil the corpse of a 23-year-old prostitute was found. It turned out to be Michelle Fatol. During sex with Fatol, van Eijk strangled her with his bare hands.
- Annelies Reinders – On 21 January 1995 the body of the 31-year-old prostitute Annelies Reinders was found in the Eems Canal near Appingedam.
- Sasja Schenker – On 17 July 2001 the lifeless, naked body of the 34-year-old prostitute Sasja Schenker was found in the Slochterdiep near Harkstede. Her clothes were found several months later near van Eijk's house. They were found to have been thrown into the canal in a plastic bag weighted with stones. Because Schenker's clothes were found near van Eijk's house, he became a prime suspect and on 12 November 2001, police arrested van Eijk. He soon confessed to the murders of Michelle Fatol, Annelies Reinders, and Sasja Schenker.

=== Possible victims ===
Between his release and his second arrest, there were eight prostitutes, and several other young women murdered in and around the area of van Eijk's residence. In 1997, van Eijk was a suspect in the murder of Anne de Ruyter de Wildt, and in 2000 for the murder of Marianne Vaatstra; however, DNA tests proved his innocence in these cases. Several years later both murderers of the two women were caught.

Between 1995 and 2001, several other bodies were found. In 1995, the torso of 24-year-old prostitute Antoinette Bont was found in the Winschoterdiep. Other body parts were later found in a sports bag. Two years later, in 1997, the body of 19-year-old prostitute Shirley Hereijgers was found. Around the same time, Jolanda Meijer (35), Hereijger's friend and colleague also disappeared. Several other men were suspected of these killings, but all turned out to be innocent. Van Eijk never confessed to killing these women, but police suspected him. The ground around his house was excavated; however, there were no bodies found. As of 2018, Jolanda Meijer, who disappeared in 1998, remains missing. All three cases remain unsolved.

== Trial and sentence ==
At the start of the trial, van Eijk was represented by lawyer Willem Anker, much to the astonishment of the relatives of Shirley Hereijgers, as Willem Anker also represented them. When van Eijk was officially declared a suspect in murdering Shirley, Willem Anker dropped his client. After going through a series of other lawyers, van Eijk was sentenced, on 7 November 2002, to life imprisonment for the murder of the last three victims. Van Eijk appealed, but the Supreme Court of the Netherlands upheld the ruling. Van Eijk several times requested clemency, which in the Netherlands can only be given by the head of state, and all of the requests were denied.

== Death ==
In 2016, van Eijk's farm in Harkstede was demolished to make way for the expansion of a new residential area. On 19 June 2019 van Eijk died in prison. The cause of death was not disclosed.

== See also ==
- List of serial killers by country
