= Arjan van der Laan =

Dutch footballer (born 1969)

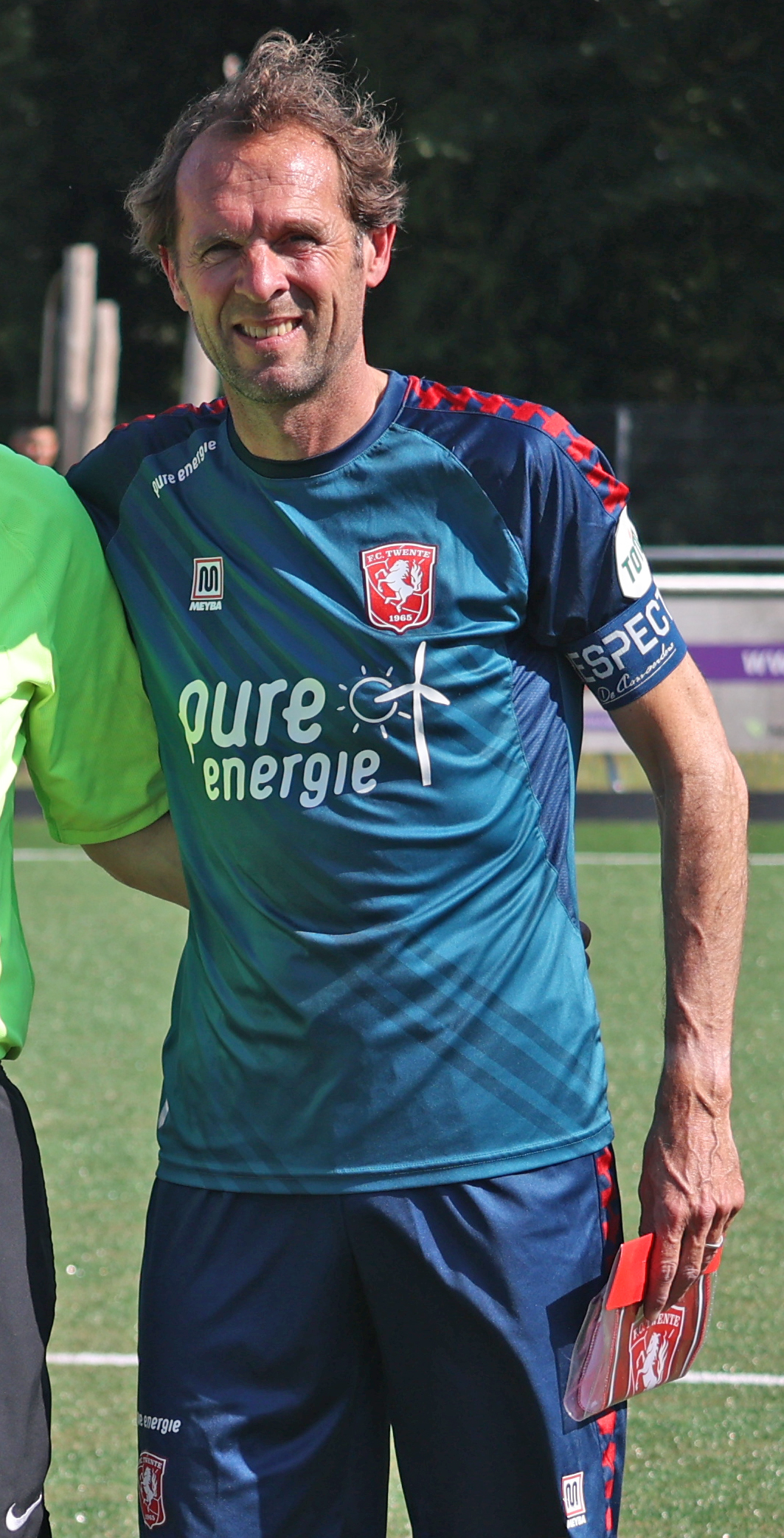

Personal information
- Full name: Arjan van der Laan
- Date of birth: 10 November 1969 (age 56)
- Place of birth: Nieuwkoop, Netherlands
- Height: 1.85 m (6 ft 1 in)
- Position: Midfielder

Team information
- Current team: RKSV Altior (manager)

Youth career
- SV Nieuwkoop

Senior career*
Years	Team	Apps	(Gls)
1987–1992	ARC		
1992–1999	Sparta Rotterdam	213	(54)
1999–2002	Twente	93	(14)
2002–2004	ADO Den Haag	44	(8)
2004–2006	Dordrecht	75	(12)

Managerial career
- 2013: Sparta Rotterdam (caretaker)
- 2013–2014: Sparta Rotterdam (caretaker)
- 2015: Lisse
- 2015–2016: Netherlands Women
- 2019–2020: TEC
- 2020–: RKSV Altior
- * Club domestic league appearances and goals

Arjan van der Laan (born 10 November 1969) is a Dutch former professional footballer, who played as a midfielder. He is the current head coach of the seventh-tier Tweede Klasse club RKSV Altior from Langeraar.

== Early life ==
Van der Laan was born in Nieuwkoop and started playing football at the age of six, at local club SV Nieuwkoop. After advancing to the senior team, he wanted to play at a higher level, and applied to ARC from Alphen aan den Rijn, who were competing at the highest amateur level.

== Playing career ==
=== Sparta Rotterdam ===
While playing at ARC, Van der Laan was scouted by Sparta Rotterdam, and at the age of 22, he made the switch to professional football. In his first season, he was used sporadically, but from the 1993–94 season on, he was a regular in the midfield of the Eredivisie side. In 1996, Van der Laan reached the final of the KNVB Cup with Sparta, which they lost 5–2 against PSV.

=== Twente ===
In the summer of 1999, Van der Laan was transferred to FC Twente. He immediately became an important player for the team, and achieved the biggest honour of his playing career by winning the 2000–01 KNVB Cup. As a result, FC Twente played in the UEFA Cup in the next season, where they were knocked out in the second round by Grasshoppers, losing 5–6 on aggregate despite two goals from Van der Laan. Nevertheless, he considers playing in these European matches "a great experience."

=== ADO Den Haag ===
In July 2002, Van der Laan moved to Eerste Divisie side ADO Den Haag. His first season was a success, as ADO became champions and achieved promotion to the Eredivisie. In the following Eredivisie season, however, Van der Laan experienced internal strife within the club and expressed a desire to leave ADO.

=== Dordrecht ===
On 25 January 2004, it was announced that Van der Laan would be loaned to Eerste Divisie club FC Dordrecht for the remainder of the season, with the intention of joining them on a free transfer after the summer break. At the end of the 2005–06 season, he retired from professional football.

== Managerial career ==
=== Early managerial career ===
Van der Laan started his managerial career in his last years of playing for FC Dordrecht, coaching various youth teams of ARC. After retiring as a player, he took up a job as youth couth at Sparta Rotterdam. He also had a one-year internship at NEC, after which he qualified for his coaching licence. Eventually, he became assistant manager of Sparta's first team. He served as interim manager twice: first in April 2013 after the dismissal of Michel Vonk, and for a second time in December 2013 after Adrie Bogers was sacked. In total, he managed Sparta for four games. In the summer of 2014, he left Sparta to become a youth coach at FC Utrecht.

=== Lisse ===
In December 2014, it was announced that Van der Laan would become the new manager of Topklasse side FC Lisse, starting from the 2015–16 season.

=== Netherlands Women ===
After only two months in charge of FC Lisse, on 24 September 2015, it was announced that Van der Laan would succeed Roger Reijners as head coach of the Netherlands women's national football team. He said it was "an honour" to become the national women's coach and that it was "fantastic to contribute" to the development of the team. His first major tournament in charge of the Netherlands was the 2016 Olympic Qualifying Tournament, where the Netherlands competed with Sweden, Norway and Switzerland for a place at the football tournament of the 2016 Summer Olympics. The Netherlands finished in second place, with group winner Sweden taking the Olympic ticket.

On 23 December 2016, Van der Laan was sacked by the KNVB, having been in charge of the Netherlands for fifteen months. According to the KNVB, they had "insufficient confidence" Van der Laan would achieve good results with the team at the Women's Euro 2017.

=== Later managerial career ===
In 2019, Van der Laan was appointed head coach of TEC alongside Gery Vink. He left the position after one season. Ahead of the 2020–21 season, he has signed a one-year contract as head coach for Sunday Tweede Klasse club RKSV Altior from Langeraar.

== Honours ==
FC Twente

- KNVB Cup: 2000–01

ADO Den Haag

- Eerste Divisie: 2002–03
