= Ter Aar =

- Flag Coat of arms

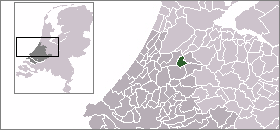
- Location in South Holland
- Coordinates: 52°9′59″N 4°42′29″E
- Country: Netherlands
- Province: South Holland
- Municipality: Nieuwkoop

Area
  - Total: 21.71 km^{2} (8.38 sq mi)
  - Land: 19.35 km^{2} (7.47 sq mi)
  - Water: 2.36 km^{2} (0.91 sq mi)

Population (1 July 2006)
  - Total: 9,007
- Postal code: 2460-2461

Ter Aar (Dutch pronunciation: [tɛr ˈaːr]) is a town and former municipality in the western Netherlands, in the province of South Holland. It is located about 6 km northeast of Alphen aan den Rijn. The town had a population of 9,007 on 1 July 2006.

The area of Ter Aar is divided into two parts by the small canal De Aar. The western, larger part is named Langeraar (Long Aar), the eastern part Korteraar (Short Aar). These are also the names of two villages in the area. In 1788, the former village of Langeraar was destroyed by a flood; a village of that name was rebuilt in the northern part of the area.

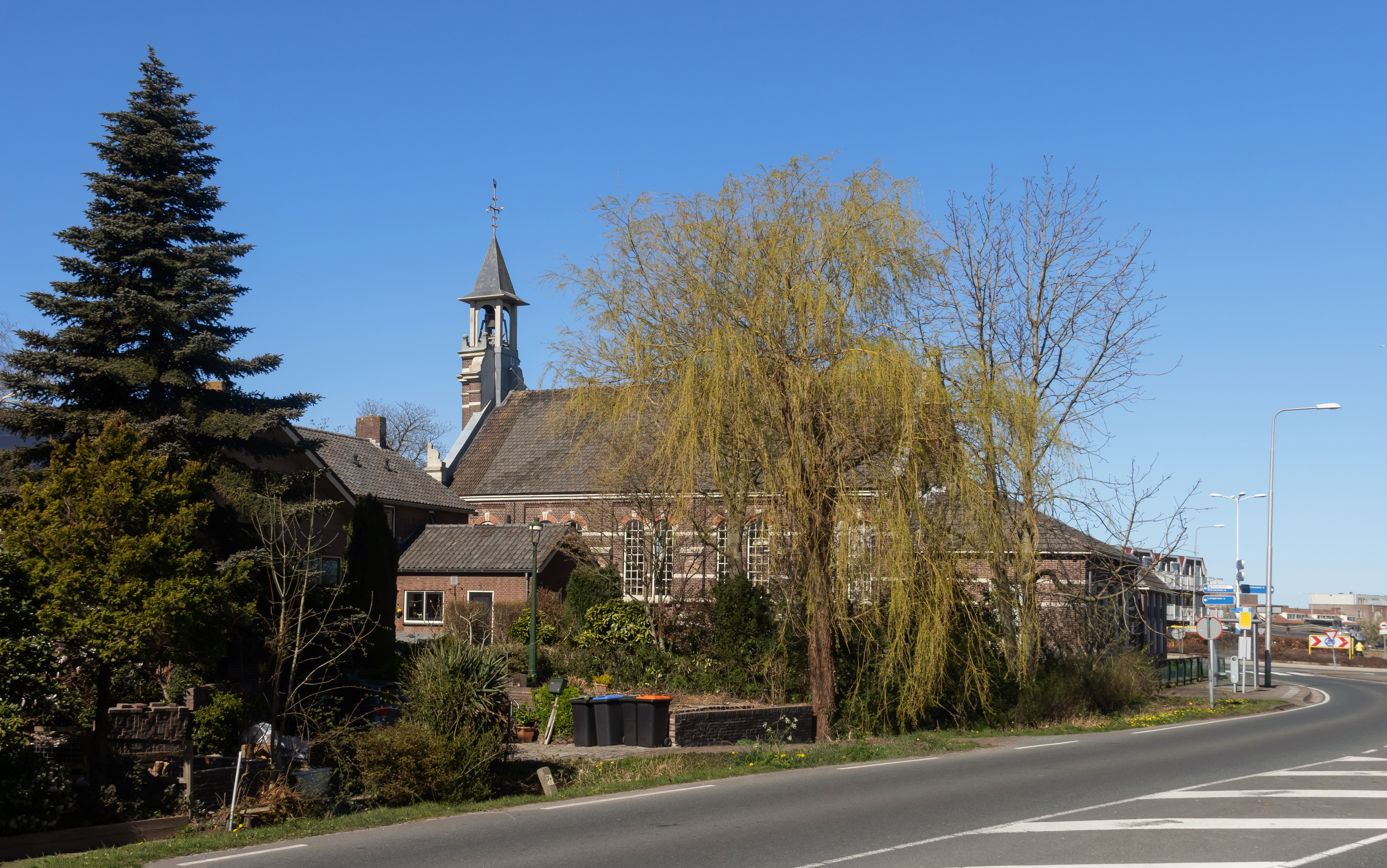
Ter Aar, reformed church

At the former location of Langeraar, the new village of Aardam (52°9′57″N 4°42′40″E) was built, near a bridge across the Aar. The Kerkbuurt (Church Neighbourhood, 52°10′15″N 4°42′0″E) was located northwest of Aardam around the reformed church, which was built in 1568. The current village of Ter Aar is built around these two former villages.

North of Aardam, the hamlet Papenveer grew around a ferry across the Aar.

The municipality Ter Aar existed from 1812 to 2007. In 1817, the small municipality of Vrijhoeven was split off; it merged again with Ter Aar in 1841. In 2004, the municipality covered an area of 21.71 km^{2} (8.38 sq mi) of which 2.34 km^{2} (0.90 sq mi) was water. Its population was 9,010. Ter Aar was merged into the municipality of Nieuwkoop on 1 January 2007.

== People from Ter Aar ==
- Jan W. van der Hoorn (1923–2017), speed skater and winner of the 1947 Elfstedentocht.
- Deborah (Bora) van der Hoorn (1927), sister of Jan W., speed skater, winner of the 1947 Ronde van Loosdrecht (120 km). She was one of six women that finished the recreational 1947 Elfstedentocht. Women were not allowed to participate in the race.
- Jan J. van der Hoorn (1931–2016), nephew of Jan W. and Bora, speed skater, one of five joined winners of the 1956 Elfstedentocht. He started a skating shop in Ter Aar.
- Lenie van der Hoorn-Langelaan (1948), winner of the 1985 Elfstedentocht, the first women's race edition, and 11 alternative Elfstedentochten
- Jos Valentijn (1952), Dutch speed skater, silver medallist at the 1973 World Sprint Championships.
- Jody Pijper (1952), Dutch voice actress and singer in Stars on 45 (Stars On, Starsound, Star Sound), a Dutch novelty pop act that was successful in Europe, the United States, and Australia in the early 1980s, with their Stars on 45 song medley.
- Jens Toornstra (1989), Dutch professional footballer, player for the Dutch national team, Feyenoord, FC Utrecht and ADO Den Haag.
- Melissa Wijfje (1995), Dutch speed skater and 2020 European Speed Skating Champion in the Women's team pursuit.
