= Vrijhoeven =

Coordinates: 52°9′15″N 4°43′10″E

Vrijhoeven (also Vrijenhoeven or De Vrijen Hoef) is a former hamlet and former municipality in the Dutch province of South Holland. It is located about 2 km south of the village of Ter Aar.

According to historian Abraham Jacob van der Aa, Vrijhoeven was a part of the heerlijkheid (manorial fief) of Aarlanderveen in the middle of the sixteenth century. In 1625 it became a separate jurisdiction. A gallows was located here, close to one of the mills of Aarlanderveen, which was named "Galgmolen" (Gallows mill).

When the municipal system was introduced in the Netherlands in 1812, Vrijhoeven became a part of the municipality of Ter Aar, but in 1817, Vrijhoeven became a separate municipality again. The municipality was very small: its area was 0.77 km^{2}. It consisted of the area between the Schoutenvaart and the current Korteraarseweg in Aarlanderveen. There were only five houses, and the population consisted of 40 people, mostly farmers.

The municipality existed between 1817 and 1841, when it became part of Ter Aar again. In 1997 Vrijhoeven was still mentioned as a hamlet in the municipality of Ter Aar. Still, it is no longer shown in more recent topographical maps.
