= Woerdense Verlaat =

- Town
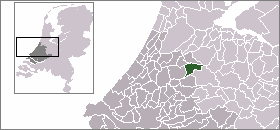

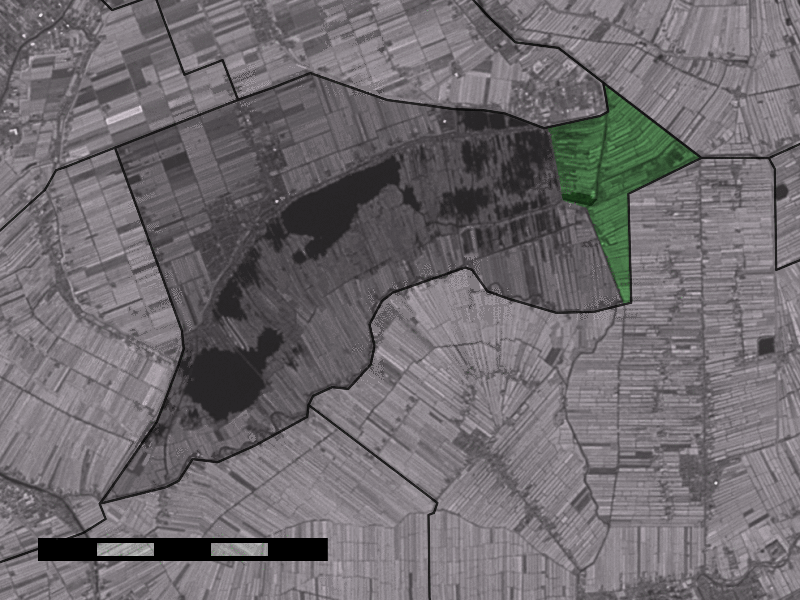
- The town centre (dark green) and the statistical district (light green) of Woerdense Verlaat in the municipality of Nieuwkoop.
- Coordinates: 52°9′16″N 4°51′46″E
- Country: Netherlands
- Province: South Holland
- Municipality: Nieuwkoop

Population (2001)
  - Total: 303
- Time zone: UTC+1 (CET)
  - Summer (DST): UTC+2 (CEST)

Woerdense Verlaat is a village in the Dutch province of South Holland. It is a part of the municipality of Nieuwkoop, and lies about 8 km north of Woerden.

In 2001, the village of Woerdense Verlaat had 303 inhabitants. Its built-up area was 0.067 km², and contained 113 residences. The statistical area "Woerdense Verlaat", which also can include the peripheral parts of the village, as well as the surrounding countryside, has a population of around 690.
