= Tamen =

Tamen is a surname. Notable people with the surname include:

- Medrano Tamen (born 1996), Cameroonian footballer
- Miguel Tamen (born 1960), Portuguese essayist, literary theorist, and philosopher
- William Tamen (born 2006), English footballer
