= Jostiband Orchestra =

Dutch orchestra for the developmentally disabled

The Jostiband Orchestra is a Dutch orchestra for the developmentally disabled.

The band was formed in September 1966 as a music club of the Johannes Stichting in Nieuwveen. In 1974, it moved to Zwammerdam, which has since been the home of the orchestra. It is currently led by Ipse de Bruggen, a conglomerate of organisations in the field of care for mentally handicapped persons.

The band currently has 200 members and is the largest developmentally disabled orchestra in the world. Concerts take place every month - normally in the Netherlands, but also abroad regularly.

The orchestra is conducted by Lyan Verburg.
