= Mijdrecht =

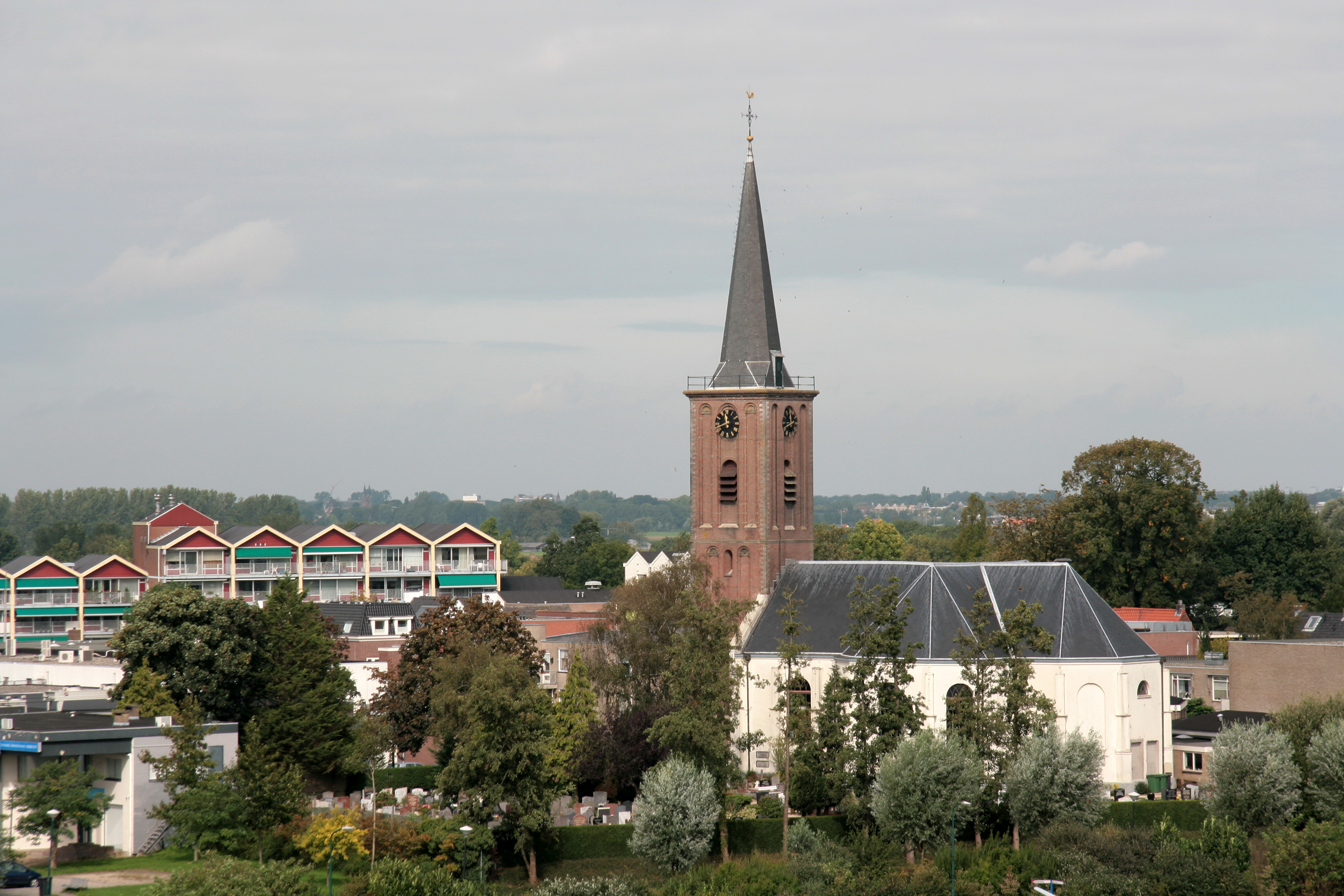

- Flag Coat of arms

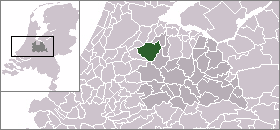

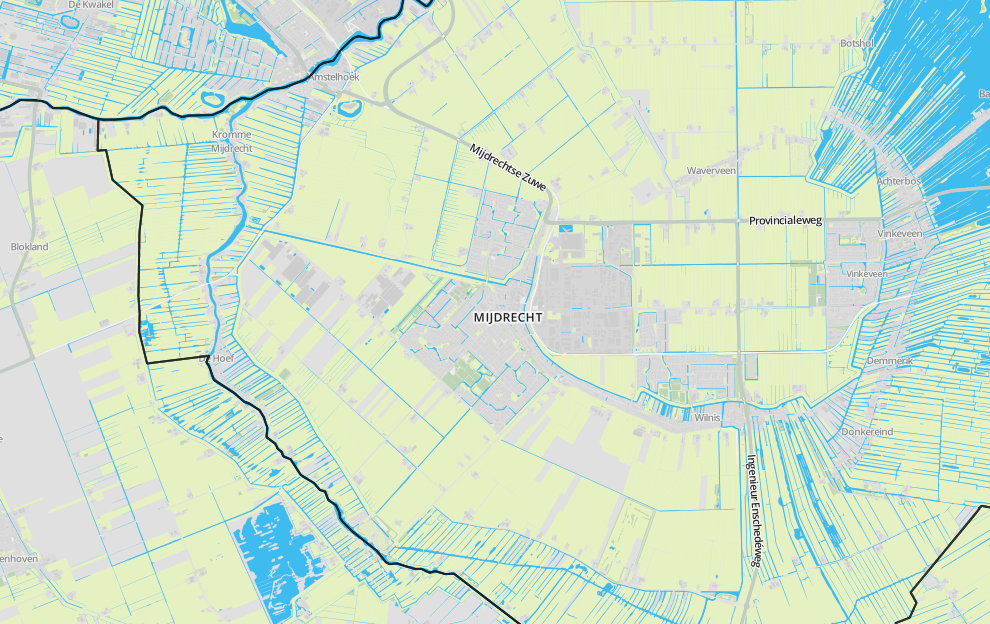
- Coordinates: 52°12′26″N 4°51′34″E
- Country: Netherlands
- Province: Utrecht
- Municipality: De Ronde Venen

Population (2019)
  - Total: 16,005
  - Density: 845/km^{2} (2,190/sq mi)

Mijdrecht is a town in the Netherlands with about 16,000 residents. It is located in the municipality of De Ronde Venen, about 7 kilometres (4.3 mi) west of the main A2 motorway, between Utrecht and Amsterdam.

The main street is the Dorpstraat, where most shops and the municipal offices are located. There is a police office, a fire department, 6 supermarkets, sport facilities, and a coffee shop. There is no police or doctor at the weekends.

== History ==
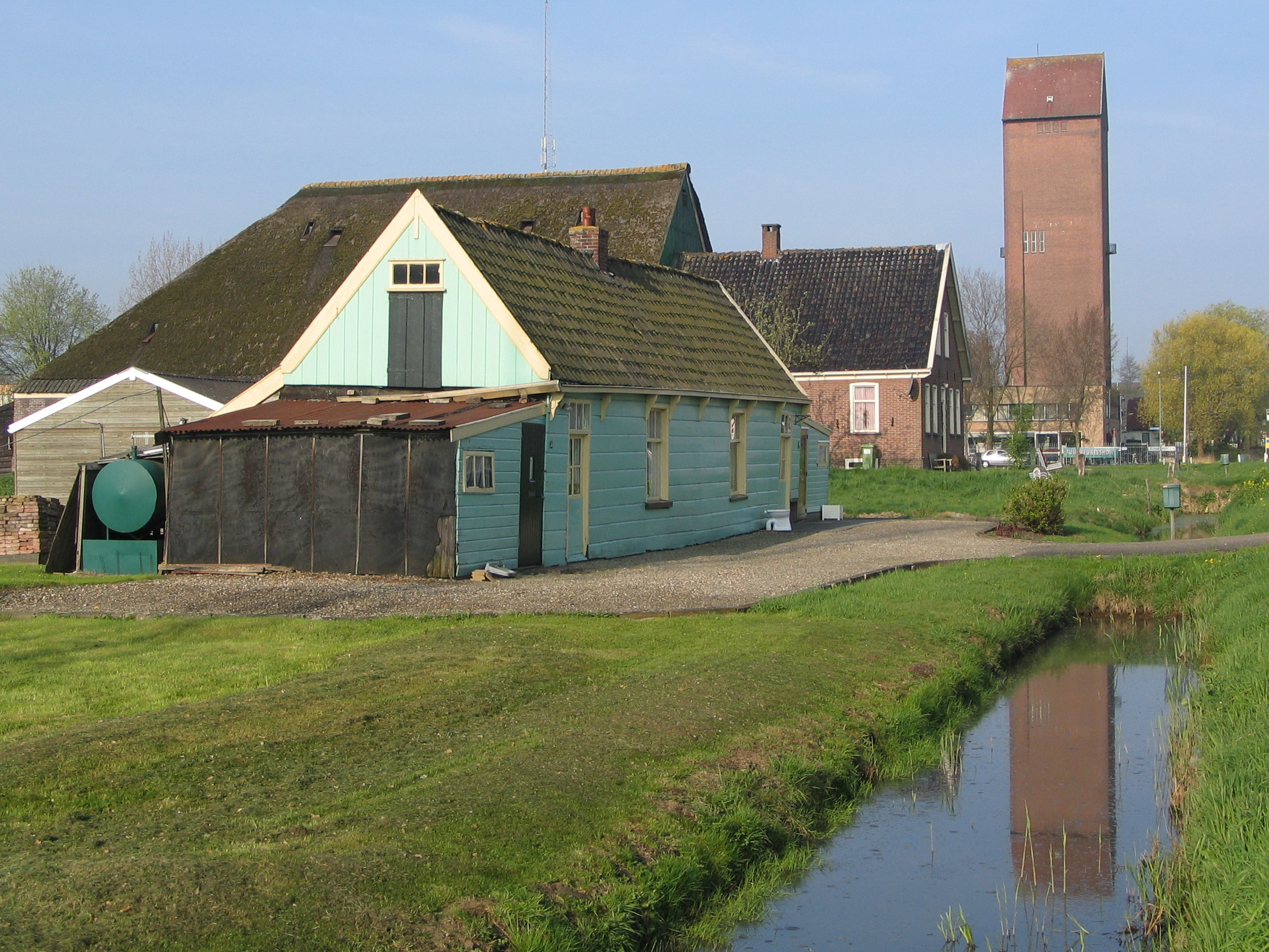
Peatcutters houses, Frisian-style farmhouse and water tower

=== Middle Ages ===
In 1085 the parish of Mijdrecht, together with those of Wilnis, Tamen, Zevenhoven en Kudelstaart, was granted to the Deaconate of St. John (Proosdij van Sint-Jan), by Conrad, the Prince-bishop of Utrecht, in return for a depot in the Holland-Utrecht border region and the guarantee that the deaconate would develop the rugged terrain for habitation. 1085 is the year taken as the founding of the municipality of Mijdrecht.

=== 19th century ===
In 1815, soon after the French-Batavian period, the mayor of Mijdrecht, Hendrikus Abraham van Doorn van Noordscharwoude, submitted a questionnaire to the Minister of War. The questionnaire, about local conditions, reported a population of 3,000, including 5 carpenters, 2 smiths, 1 brazier, 2 brick-layers, 6 bakers, 8 tailors, and 6 cobblers.

=== 20th century ===
Most parts of the town (like Hofland-Noord and Molenland) were built after 1980.

In 1989 the municipality of Mijdrecht was merged into De Ronde Venen.

=== 21st century ===
The city has continued to grow through "Wickelhof I and II" expansions.

== Demographics ==
During the early 20th Century, Mijdrecht was a growing community. In 1925, the then-municipality of Mijdrecht had a population of 4,506, which grew to 4,618 in 1940. In 1950, the population of the municipality had grown to 5,379. In 1988, the last year that Mijdrecht was a separate municipality, the municipality population was 16,414.

In recent years, Mijdrecht has had a declining population. In 2016 it had a population of 15,230, compared to 15,865 in 2010. This decline is particular in the 0-15 and 25-45 age ranges, with children (0-15) declining from 18% of the population in 2010 to 16% in 2016, and mid-range adults (25-45) declining from 25% in 2010 to 22% in 2016. By contrast, the percentage of seniors (65+) has grown from 14% in 2010 to 18% in 2016.

== Neighborhoods ==
Mijdrecht consists of a downtown center around the Dorpstraat, and a number of planned residential neighborhoods, of which Proostdijland is the oldest.

Neighborhoods (wijken)	Population (2019)
Bedrijventerrein Mijdrecht	170
Hofland	3,600
Mijdrecht Dorp	1,450
Molenland	3,200
Proostdijland	3,590
Twistvlied-Wickelhof	3,105
Total	15,115

The rural area around the town is home to another 880 inhabitants.

== Governance ==
Ever since the mergers of the municipalities of Mijdrecht, Wilnis, and Vinkeveen/Waverveen in 1989, Mijdrecht has been governed by the Municipality of De Ronde Venen. The municipality is governed by a Municipal Council (Dutch: gemeenteraad) presently consisting of 27 councillors.

Day-to-day executive administration is performed by the council of mayor and aldermen (Dutch: college van burgemeester en wethouders). The mayor, Maarten Divendal, was appointed by the crown on 22 November 2011. The remainder of the council consists of three aldermen and the municipal secretary, who heads the municipal administration.

== Business ==
Mijdrecht is the location for the Dutch branch of S. C. Johnson & Son, where it is housed in an office building designed by Hugh Maaskant on the Groot-Mijdrechtstraat.

The following numbers of businesses by sector were reported by Statistics Netherlands for 2016:

Businesses by sector	Quantity
Total	1,590
Agriculture, forestry, and fishing	10
Industry and energy	265
Trade and catering	395
Transportation, information, and communication	140
Business services	440
Culture, recreation, and other	150

== Culture ==
=== Education ===
==== Elementary ====
Mijdrecht has seven elementary schools, one in nearly all of the residential neighborhoods. A number of these are public, Catholic and Protestant.

School	Neighborhood	Denomination
De Fontein	Proostdijland	Protestant
Driehuis	Molenland	Catholic
De Windroos	Proostdijland	Catholic
Hofland	Hofland-Zuid	Catholic
De Twister	Molenland	Public
De Eendracht	Hofland-Zuid	Public

==== Secondary ====
There is one high/secondary school called Veenlanden College. The Mijdrecht campus of the school contains around 1500 students in MAVO, HAVO and Atheneum levels.

=== Recreation ===
Mijdrecht is home to the football and basketball club SV Argon, which was created after a merger of three football clubs in Mijdrecht and Wilnis in 1971.

From 1982 until 2012, Mijdrecht was the location for an annual national festival called AJOC (Algemene Jongeren Ontspannings Club - General Youth Recreation Club).

=== Religion ===
In 1937, the provincial almanac of Utrecht reported Mijdrecht having a population of 4,717, of whom 1,838 were Roman Catholic, 1,646 Dutch Reformed, 877 Reformed, and 136 not being members of a church. Currently, there are numerous protestant churches, of various denominations and one Catholic Church. There was also a synagogue on the Kerkweg.

Presently, Mijdrecht also has a Muslim community with two mosques. One is the Hakyol Moskee in Twistvlied, which shares an address with the Veenhartkerk, a Christian Reformed church. The other is Moskee Omar, located in Hofland, which shares an address with the Koninkrijkszaal of Jehovah's Witnesses.

== Notable people ==
- Irfan Bachdim, Indonesian footballer
- Lesly de Sa, professional footballer
- Anouk Hoogendijk, professional footballer
- Henk Norel, professional international basketball player
- Lorena Wiebes, professional cyclist
