= Noordeinde, Nieuwkoop =

Noordeinde
- Town
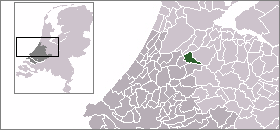

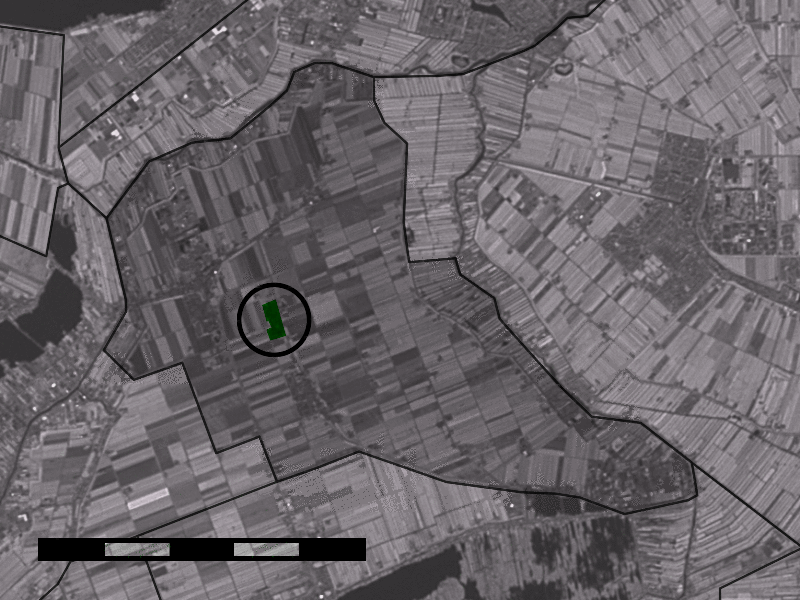
- Noordeinde in the former municipality of Liemeer.
- Coordinates: 52°12′N 4°46′E
- Country: Netherlands
- Province: South Holland
- Municipality: Nieuwkoop

Population (2001)
  - Total: 561
- Time zone: UTC+1 (CET)
  - Summer (DST): UTC+2 (CEST)

Noordeinde is a town in the Dutch province of South Holland. It is a part of the municipality of Nieuwkoop, and lies about 10 km northeast of Alphen aan den Rijn.

In 2001, the town of Noordeinde had 561 inhabitants. The built-up area of the town was 0.12 km^{2}, and contained 196 residences.
