= Paul B. Coremans =

Belgian scientist

Paul Coremans
- Born: 29 April 1906; Borgerhout, Belgium
- Died: 11 June 1965 (aged 57); Noorden, Netherlands
- Education: Free University of Brussels
- Known for: Cultural heritage management
- Scientific career
- Fields: Analytical chemistry
- Workplaces: Royal Museums of Art and History

Paul Bernard Joseph Marie Coremans (29 April 1908 – 11 June 1965) was a Belgian scientist who advanced the fields of cultural heritage management and cultural heritage curation. He was the founder and first director of the Royal Institute for Cultural Heritage.

The Institute organizes an international symposium in honour of Coremans on 15–17 June 2015.

== Early career ==
Coremans studied Latin and Greek at Koninklijk Atheneum Antwerp from 1920 to 1926. After completing a doctorate in analytical chemistry at the Free University of Brussels (ULB) in 1932, he stayed on as a library assistant. In 1934, Jean Capart, curator of the Royal Museums of Art and History of Brussels, invited him to assemble a laboratory and to reorganize the RMAH's system for photographic artifacts.

In his new position, Coremans used laboratory techniques to authenticate artifacts and evaluate their condition. Analysis through radiography, thermography, and ultraviolet light enabled Capart to study objects quickly; he published his results in the Bulletin des musées (Journal of the Royal Museums of Art and History). In 1935, Coremans published his initial researches into the air conditioning of museums. All the while, Coremans took pertinent courses: metallography at ULB; spectroscopy at the University of Liège; history of Flemish painting in the fifteenth century at the Royal Museums of Fine Arts of Belgium.

== World War II ==
During World War II, Capart asked Coremans to oversee a cultural heritage documentation project. Coremans invited volunteers to photograph monuments and public art around Belgium, to complete the collection of 30 000 negatives belonging to the photographic service of the Royal Museums of Art and History (among which 12 000 realized by the Germans during the First World War). He was supported in this task by Jozef Muls, director of the Administration of Fine Arts, and Constant Leurs, director of the « Commissariat général à la Restauration du Pays ». Coremans recruited young people, preventing them from being sent to Germany for compulsory labour. He obtained photographers' collaboration in all the provinces of the kingdom. 160 000 views were taken. It was the basis of the « Archives centrales iconographiques d'Art national ». Armed Resistance fighter, Coremans hid young resistance fighters and objectors to forced labour in Germany, in the buildings of the Jubilee park (Parc du Cinquantenaire). His team fulfilled emergency missions to save fragments of the Saint Gertrude of Nivelles shrine, and mural paintings in the churches of Saint-Brice and Saint-Quentin in Tournai. He also focused on the preservation of artworks in the Bruges museums, moved them to the castle of Lavaux-Sainte-Anne, as well as those stored in various shelters in Ghent, Antwerp and Brussels. He made every effort to prevent their condition from deteriorating. In 1942, he was assigned to the direction of the laboratories of the Royal Museums of Art and History .

== After the war ==
Coremans helped officials return artworks stolen from Belgian citizens by the Nazis. This confidential mission raised questions concerning the protection of heritage in wartime: Coremans undertook an international survey on the subject. This led to drafting a series of directives published in 1946 in the handbook La protection scientifique des œuvres d'art en temps de guerre; l'expérience européenne pendant les années 1939 à 1945.

Meanwhile, museum services of which Coremans was in charge grew bigger, resulting in 1948 in the creation of the « Archives Centrales iconographiques d'Art national et Laboratoire central des musées de Belgique (ACL) », an autonomous institution of which Coremans became the first director. ACL would be renamed in 1957 « Royal Institute for Cultural Heritage ». In the same year, Coremans was appointed as an expert in the trial of the forger Han van Meegeren, which earned him great fame afterwards, but also numerous attacks emanating from collectors who had been duped.

In 1948, he was appointed lecturer at the University of Ghent where he introduced, for the first time in Belgium, the teaching of technology and scientific examination of works of art, for archeology and art history students, with the aim to include physical characteristics of artwork alongside aesthetic and historical considerations. This experience of the meeting between hard and social sciences led him to reorganize the ACL into three departments: Documentation, Conservation-Restoration and Laboratories: the concept of interdisciplinarity was born.

The first major restoration project of the ACL, in 1950, was the restoration of the Ghent Altarpiece by the brothers Hubert and Jan van Eyck. Other restorations would follow in the same spirit of collaboration. The need to disseminate the methods implemented in these restorations led to publication of the Bulletin of the Royal Institute for Cultural heritage from 1958. At the same time, under the leadership of Coremans, the National Research Centre « Flemish Primitives », was set up, in collaboration with Herman Bouchery and Jacques Lavalleye . The Centre went on to publish several series of books, enabling the Royal Institute for Cultural Heritage to increase its international activity. Because of his experience in the field of research centres, Coremans is appointed in 1957 a member of the Special Review Board of Scientific Research, established by the National Council for Science Policy. Between 1951 and 1954, he participated actively in the creation of the Brussels Art Seminar, a university programme established by the Belgian American Educational Foundation, where he proposed courses in techniques used in painting. Eminent specialists, such as Erwin Panofsky, took part. This intense activity, on a national and international level, called for the Royal Institute of Cultural Heritage to move into new premises, independent and custom-built. Coremans studied in detail the requirements of each of the departments of the Institute with René Sneyers, assistant director, and Maurice Vanden Stock, administrative director. Begun in 1959, the new building was completed in 1962, and was seen as a model of its kind to inspire other foreign institutions. For Coremans, it was mainly the opportunity to rationalize and to develop the training activities of the Institute, by creating a regular programme of post-graduate courses in scientific examination and the preservation of cultural property. Coremans devoted his last years with intense energy to this educational activity. The concept and the dissemination of interdisciplinary teaching in this field was one of its primary concerns. During 1963 he gave courses in both theoretical and practical conservation at the Royal Institute of Cultural Heritage, in collaboration with the Belgian American Educational Foundation and the Conservation Center of the New York University Institute of Fine Arts.

He died on 11 June 1965 in Noorden. His laboratories manager, René Sneyers, became the second director of the Royal Institute for Cultural Heritage.

Paul Coremans is internationally recognized as a promoter of interest in the world's artistic heritage, an interest he helped to develop by the implementation of his innovative concepts.

== See also ==
- Monuments, Fine Arts, and Archives program

== Publications ==
- (in French) Paul Coremans, Sur le déplacement des électrolytes adsorbés, Ph.D thesis, université libre de Bruxelles, 1932.
- (in Dutch) Paul Coremans, De wetenschappelijke bescherming der kunstwerken in oorlogstijd, Laboratoire central des musées belges, Bruxelles, 1946, 32 p.
- (in French) Paul Coremans et Aquilin Janssens de Bisthoven, Van Eyck. L'adoration de l'Agneau mystique, De Nederlandsche Boekhandel, Anvers, 1948, 45 p.
- Paul Coremans, Van Meegeren's faked Vermeers and de Hooghs. A scientific examination, J. M. Meulenhoff, Amsterdam, 1949, 40 p.
- (in French) Centre national de recherches "Primitifs flamands", L'Agneau mystique au laboratoire : examen et traitement, De Sikkel, Anvers, 1953, 132 p.
- (in French) Paul Coremans (ea), Utilisation des lampes fluorescentes dans les musées. Considérations générales et conseils pratiques à l'usage des directeurs et des conservateurs de musées, ICOM, Paris, 1953, 14 p.

== Bibliography ==
- (in French) Paul Philippot, « Coremans, Paul, Bernard, Joseph, Marie », in Nouvelle Biographie nationale , 4, Bruxelles, 1997, p. 69–73.
- (in French) Marie-Christine Claes, « Un héritage bénéfique des guerres mondiales en Belgique. Le concept et les collections de l'IRPA », in Bruxelles Patrimoines , n° 11–12, 2014, pp. 60–73.
