= Nieuwveen =

- Town
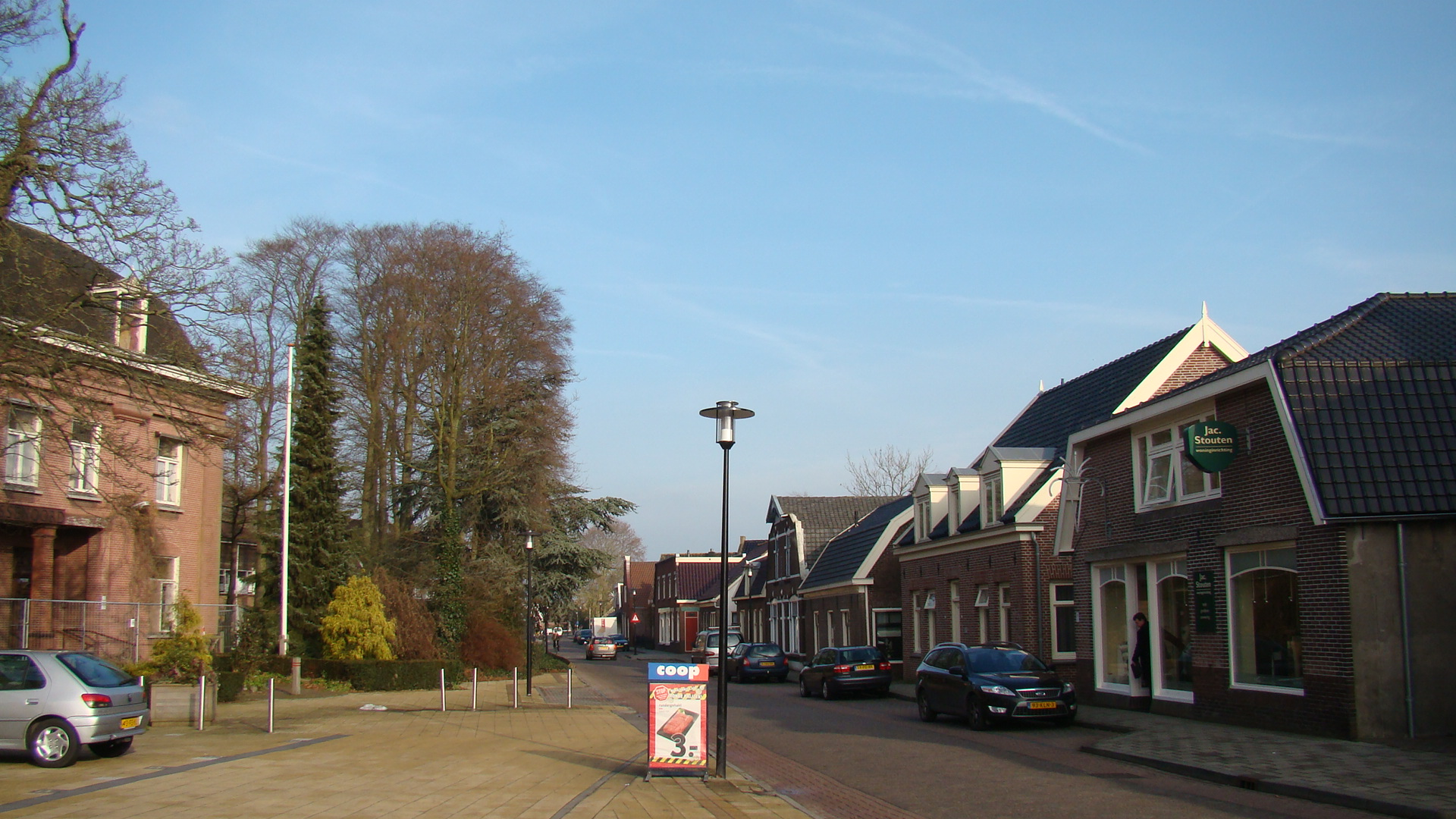
- Dorpsstraat

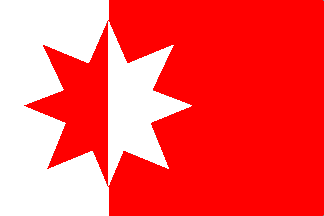
- Flag Coat of arms

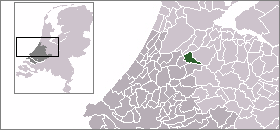

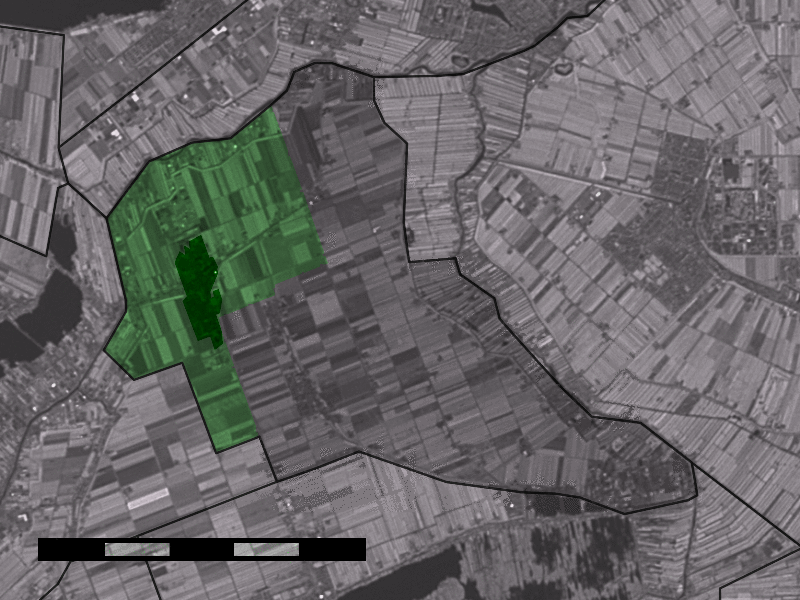
- The town centre (dark green) and the statistical district (light green) of Nieuwveen in the municipality of Liemeer.
- Coordinates: 52°11′40″N 4°45′25″E
- Country: Netherlands
- Province: South Holland
- Municipality: Nieuwkoop

Population (2004)
  - Total: 3,970
- Time zone: UTC+1 (CET)
  - Summer (DST): UTC+2 (CEST)

Nieuwveen is a town in the Dutch province of South Holland, located close to the border of province North Holland, about 35 kilometers (22 miles) southwest of the city of Amsterdam. It is a part of the municipality of Nieuwkoop (until 2007: Liemeer), and lies about 9 kilometers (6 miles) northeast of Alphen aan den Rijn.

In 2001, the town of Nieuwveen had 2,806 inhabitants. The built-up area of the town was 0.73 km^{2}, and contained 931 residences. The statistical area "Nieuwveen", which also can include the peripheral parts of the village, as well as the surrounding countryside, has a population of around 3,630 people.

Zevenhoven was added to the municipality of Nieuwveen in 1991, and the municipality was renamed Liemeer in 1994. The Jostiband Orchestra was founded here.
