= Royal Institute for Cultural Heritage =

Belgian federal scientific institute

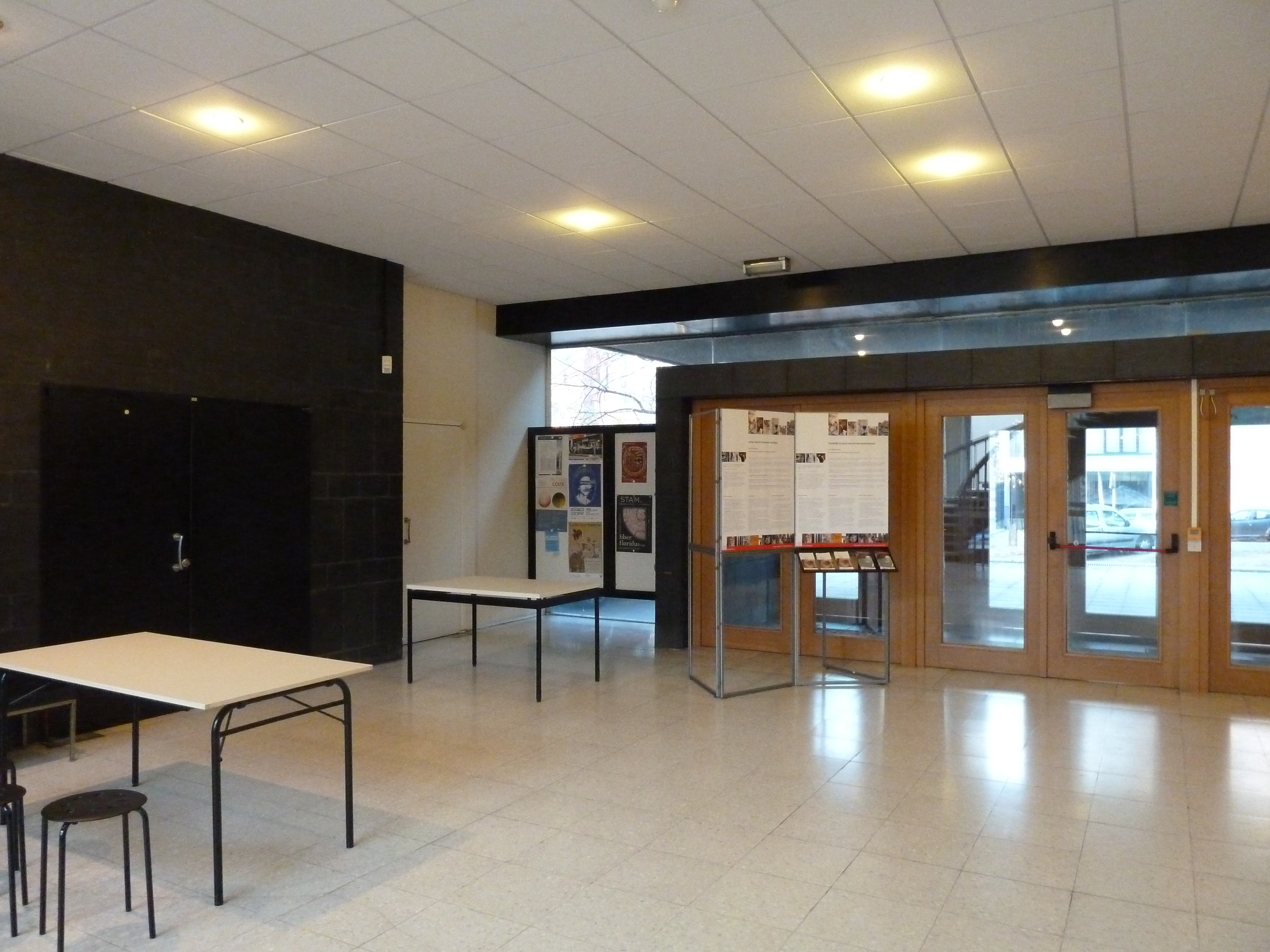
Location of the awards ceremony of WLM: Royal Institute for Cultural Heritage, Brussels

The Royal Institute for Cultural Heritage (KIK-IRPA, for Koninklijk Instituut voor het Kunstpatrimonium - Institut Royal du Patrimoine Artistique) is a Belgian federal institute of the Belgian Federal Science Policy Office (BELSPO). The institute studies and conserves the artistic and cultural assets of Belgium. Its mission consists in research and public service. The personnel of the institute consists of conservator-restorers, historians of art, photographers, chemists, physicists and many other scientists. Hilde De Clercq is the General Director of the institute.

== History ==
The institute was established in 1948 as the Archives Centrales iconographiques d'Art national et Laboratoire central des Musées de Belgique (Central Iconographic Archives of National Art and the Central Laboratory of Belgian Museums, ACL). Its founder and first director was Paul B. Coremans (1908-1965). In 1957 the ACL becomes one of the ten national scientific institutions under the name Royal Institute for Cultural Heritage (KIK-IRPA). The building of the institute, finished in 1963, was the first in the world specially designed to promote the interdisciplinary approach to works of art. The building was designed by architect Charles Rimanque based on an initial technical concept by René Sneyers.

== Departments ==
The institute consists of three departments:

- Documentation: inventory and photography studio, databases, valorization and communication
- Laboratories: materials and technics, research on methodology of conservation and maintenance of monuments
- Conservation and restoration: paintings, sculptures and art industry

=== Online artworks pages ===
In the images database BALaT, each artwork is assigned a record number. To reference an artwork page directly, use the code listed at the bottom of the record, usually of the form: http://balat.kikirpa.be/object/ followed by the artwork's record number. For example, the artwork record number for the Ghent Altarpiece is 21, so its BALaT artwork page can be referenced as http://balat.kikirpa.be/object/21.

== Culture ==
2023 : The Heart of Heritage, documentary film directed by Nina Degraeve

== See also ==
- Cultural heritage
- Culture of Belgium
