= Miguel Tamen =

Portuguese author and academic

Miguel Tamen (born 1960) is a Portuguese literary theorist, philosopher, essayist, and academic. He has written a number of books including Friends of Interpretable Objects (2004) and Manners of Interpretation: The Ends of Argument in Literary Studies (1993). Tamen has taught at the University of Lisbon since 1990. He co-founded the university's Program in Literary Theory. He was Dean of the School of Arts and Humanities at the university between 2018 and 2024.

== Career ==
Tamen obtained his bachelor of arts from the University of Lisbon and a PhD in comparative literature from the University of Minnesota (1989).

Tamen has taught at the University of Lisbon since 1990. He co-founded the university's Program in Literary Theory with António M. Feijó, in 1991. He is a full professor (professor catedrático).

He has also served as visiting professor at several international universities, including Stanford University and the University of Chicago (2000–2014), and was a fellow at the Stanford Humanities Center and the National Humanities Center. He was a weekly columnist for the Portuguese newspaper Observador between 2014 and 2017, and again since 2023.

Since February 2025, he has been Director of the Gulbenkian Institute for Advanced Study at the Calouste Gulbenkian Foundation.

== Works ==
Tamen has written a number of books. His books have been published in both Portuguese and English. They include:

- Manners of Interpretation: The Ends of Argument in Literary Studies State University of New York Press (1993) ISBN 978-0-7914-1504-7
- The Matter of the Facts: On Invention and Interpretation. Stanford University Press (2000) ISBN 978-0-8047-3432-5
- Friends of Interpretable Objects. Harvard University Press. (2001) ISBN 978-0-674-01368-1
- What Art Is Like, In Constant Reference to the Alice Books. Harvard University Press. (2012) ISBN 978-0-674-06706-6
- Closeness. Juxta Press (2021) ISBN 978-88-944972-8-1
- Thinking with Words: A Literary Groundwork with Brett Bourbon. Routledge (2025) ISBN 978-1-032-45728-4

== Reception ==
Of his book What Art Is Like, In Constant Reference to the Alice Books, Michael R. Spicher in the peer-reviewed journal, Review of Metaphysics, highlighted the book’s unconventional argumentative style and its contribution to debates on the nature of art. Of Tamen, Peter Lamarque, writing in Notre Dame Philosophical Reviews, said as a philosopher, Tamen "reveal[s] the extraordinary in the ordinary, the mysterious in the mundane, making the familiar unfamiliar, and all in a style entirely his own.

Writing in The Guardian, Steven Poole described Friends of Interpretable Objects as “suavely Wittgensteinian and insatiably curious”.

In Portuguese media, iOnline characterized his essays as marked by intellectual rigor and stylistic clarity, while Público discussed his contributions to debates on the Portuguese literary canon.
