= René Sneyers =

Belgian chemist

René Victor Gustave Joseph Sneyers (6 April 1918, Gembloux – 26 August 1984, Brussels) was a Belgian chemist. He succeeded Paul B. Coremans as head of the Institut royal du patrimoine artistique (IRPA).

== Life ==
He gained his diploma in sciences (majoring in chemistry) from the Free University of Brussels in 1941 and later the same year gained work experience at the Laboratoire Intercommunal de Bruxelles de Chimie et de Bactériologie (LIBCB, now known as "Brulabo") and began writing a doctoral thesis. However, the university was closed between 1942 and 1944 by the German occupiers – during that time he worked on analytical chemistry under Paul Coremans at the Solvay S.A.'s central laboratory.

In 1947 he was taken on as head of the newly founded laboratory at the Archives Centrales iconographiques pour l’Art national et le Laboratoire central des musées belges (ACL). Coremans headed the Institut until 1957, when it was renamed IRPA, the name it still bears. Sneyers took part in scientific research on the Ghent Altarpiece by Hubert and Jan van Eyck), examined and restored by ACL between 1950 and 1951. He and the restorer Albert Philippot collaborated on two important chapters in "L'Agneau mystique au Laboratoire", a publication then considered revolutionary due to its interdisciplinary collaboration between art historians, chemists and restorers. Philippot and Sneyers continued their collaboration on other works by Dirk Bouts, Hans Memling, Justus van Gent, Peter Paul Rubens and others.

At the end of the 1950s, there was a new focus on researching the aging and conservation of stone buildings and sculptures. Coremans entrusted this task to Sneyers and sent him to Paris to study French methods of cleaning buildings' façades. On his return to Belgium, he introduced a water-based cleaning method. He made contact with 67 specialists in 32 countries and showed them his studies, allowing him to take part in a number of ICOM conferences as well as to establish a scientific committee on stone conservation within the Icomos Belgique. UNESCO also consulted him as an expert for its restoration of the Acropolis of Athens. Sneyers also played an important role in opening a new building to house the IRPA in 1962 and setting up its ethos and techniques. He also worked for five years with its architect Charles Rimanque, the first time a building had been wholly conceived and equipped for art and architectural conservation.

On Paul Coremans' death in 1965, Sneyers became the interim head of the IRPA for seven years before being permanently made director of the Institut in 1972. The linguistic law of 1966 prevented him from recruiting any new personnel until 1977, impeding the institution's functioning until it could be overcome. He retired in 1983 and died less than a year later.
