= Nieuwkoop =

- Municipality
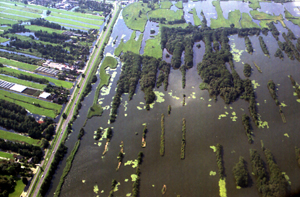
- Nieuwkoopse plassen

- Flag Coat of arms

- Location in South Holland
- Coordinates: 52°11′N 4°46′E
- Country: Netherlands
- Province: South Holland

Government
  - Body: Municipal council
  - Mayor: Robbert-Jan van Duijn (CDA)

Area
  - Total: 91.16 km^{2} (35.20 sq mi)
  - Land: 78.05 km^{2} (30.14 sq mi)
  - Water: 13.11 km^{2} (5.06 sq mi)
- Elevation: −5 m (−16 ft)

Population (January 2021)
  - Total: 29,151
  - Density: 373/km^{2} (970/sq mi)
- Time zone: UTC+1 (CET)
  - Summer (DST): UTC+2 (CEST)
- Postcode: 2420–2441, 2460–2461, 3651–3653
- Area code: 0172, 0297
- Website: www.nieuwkoop.nl

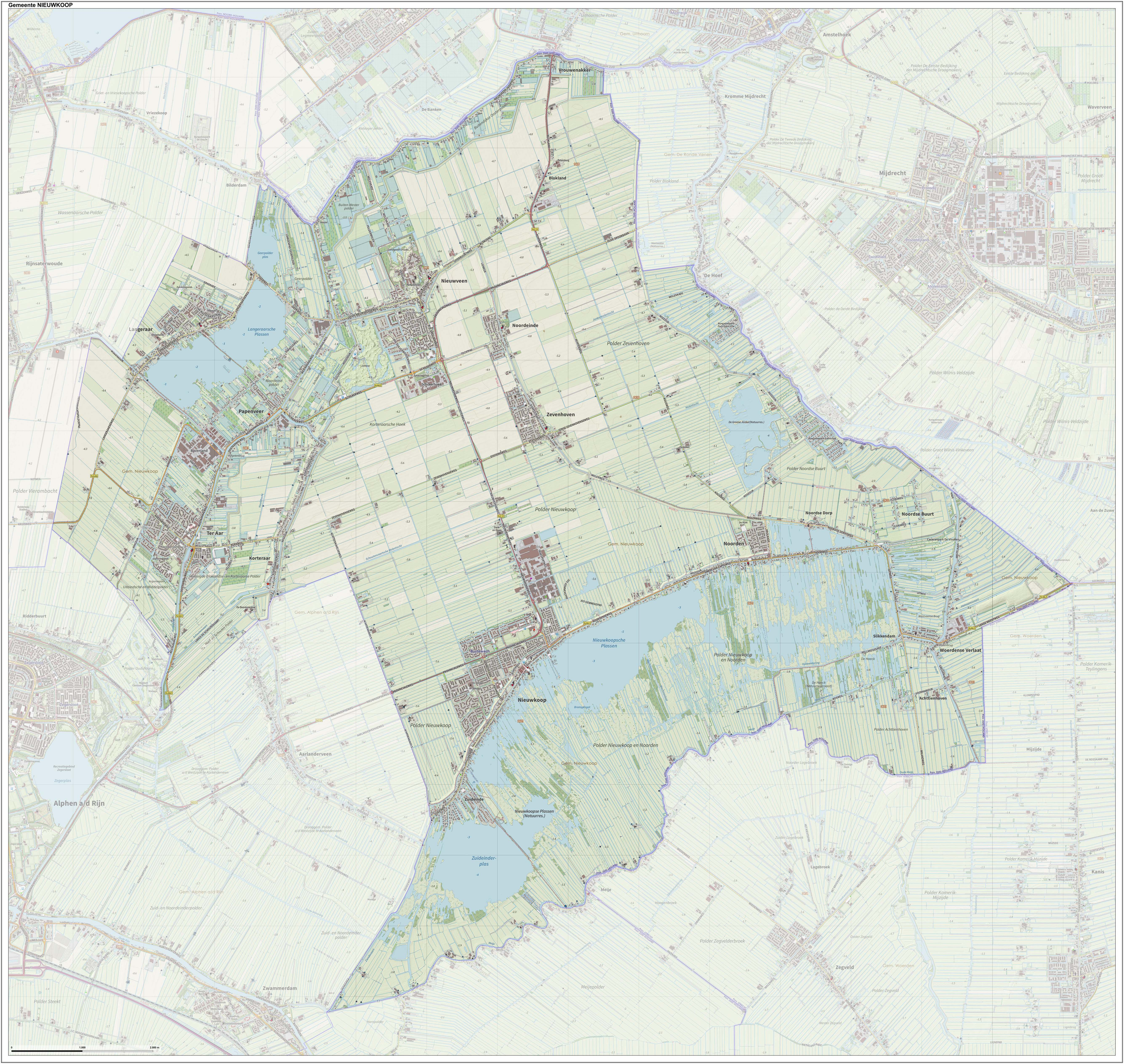
Topographic map of Nieuwkoop, June 2015

Nieuwkoop (Dutch pronunciation: [ˈniukoːp]) is a town and municipality in the western Netherlands, in the province of South Holland. The municipality was enlarged on 1 January 2007, through the amalgamation of Liemeer and Ter Aar. The municipality now covers an area of 91.16 km^{2} (35.20 sq mi) of which 13.11 km^{2} (5.06 sq mi) is water. Its population was 29,151 in 2021.

On May 3, 2008, the Dutch newspaper Algemeen Dagblad published an article which stated that Nieuwkoop is the safest municipality of the Netherlands.

The municipality of Nieuwkoop includes the following communities:

- Aardam
- Korteraar
- Langeraar
- Nieuwkoop
- Nieuwveen
- Noordeinde
- Noorden
- Noordsedorp
- Papenveer
- Ter Aar
- Vrouwenakker
- Woerdense Verlaat
- Zevenhoven

== History ==
The oldest part of Nieuwkoop are the buildings along the Nieuwkoopse Plassen (Nieuwkoop's Ponds), many of which are completely surrounded by water and accessible over individual bridges to the main road. The Nieuwkoopse Plassen are shallow lakes that were dug for peat harvesting in the 16th century and are now designated as a natural monument. New neighborhoods northwest of the main road are built after World War II.

== Notable people ==
- John of Leiden (1509 in Zevenhoven – 1536) a Dutch leader of the Anabaptism movement in Münster
- Catharina Oostfries (1636 in Nieuwkoop – 1708) a Dutch Golden Age glass painter
- Willem van Eijk (1941 in Korteraar – 2019) a twice convicted Dutch serial killer
- Daan Roosegaarde (born 1979 in Nieuwkoop) a Dutch artist who merges technology and art
- Froukje (born 2001 in Nieuwkoop) a Dutch singer-songwriter

=== Sport ===
- Wil Burgmeijer (born 1947 in Ter Aar) a retired Dutch speed skater, competed at the 1968 Winter Olympics
- Jos Valentijn (born 1952 in Ter Aar) a retired speed skater
- Petra de Bruin (born 1962 in Nieuwkoop) a Dutch former cyclist
- Ralph Schwarz (1967 in Nieuwkoop – 1992) a Dutch rower, competed in the 1988 Summer Olympics
- Arjan van der Laan (born 1969 in Nieuwkoop) a Dutch former footballer with 427 club caps, was manager of the Netherlands women's national football team
- Sander Berk (born 1979 in Nieuwveen) a Dutch triathlete
- Laurien van der Graaff (born 1987 in Nieuwkoop) a Swiss cross-country skier, competed at the 2014 Winter Olympics for Switzerland
- Melissa Wijfje (born 1995 in Ter Aar) a Dutch allround speed skater

== Gallery ==
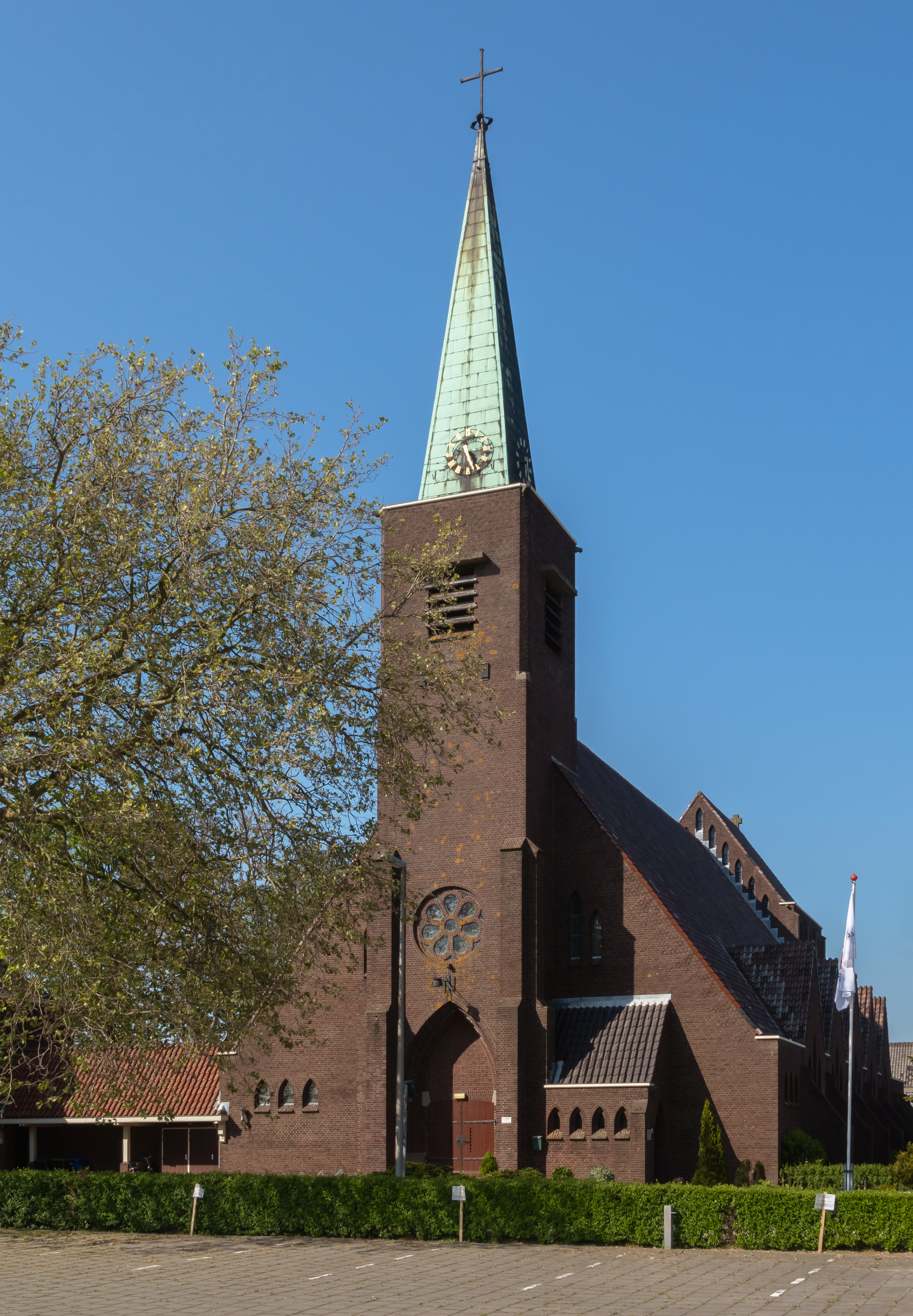
Nieuwkoop, catholic church

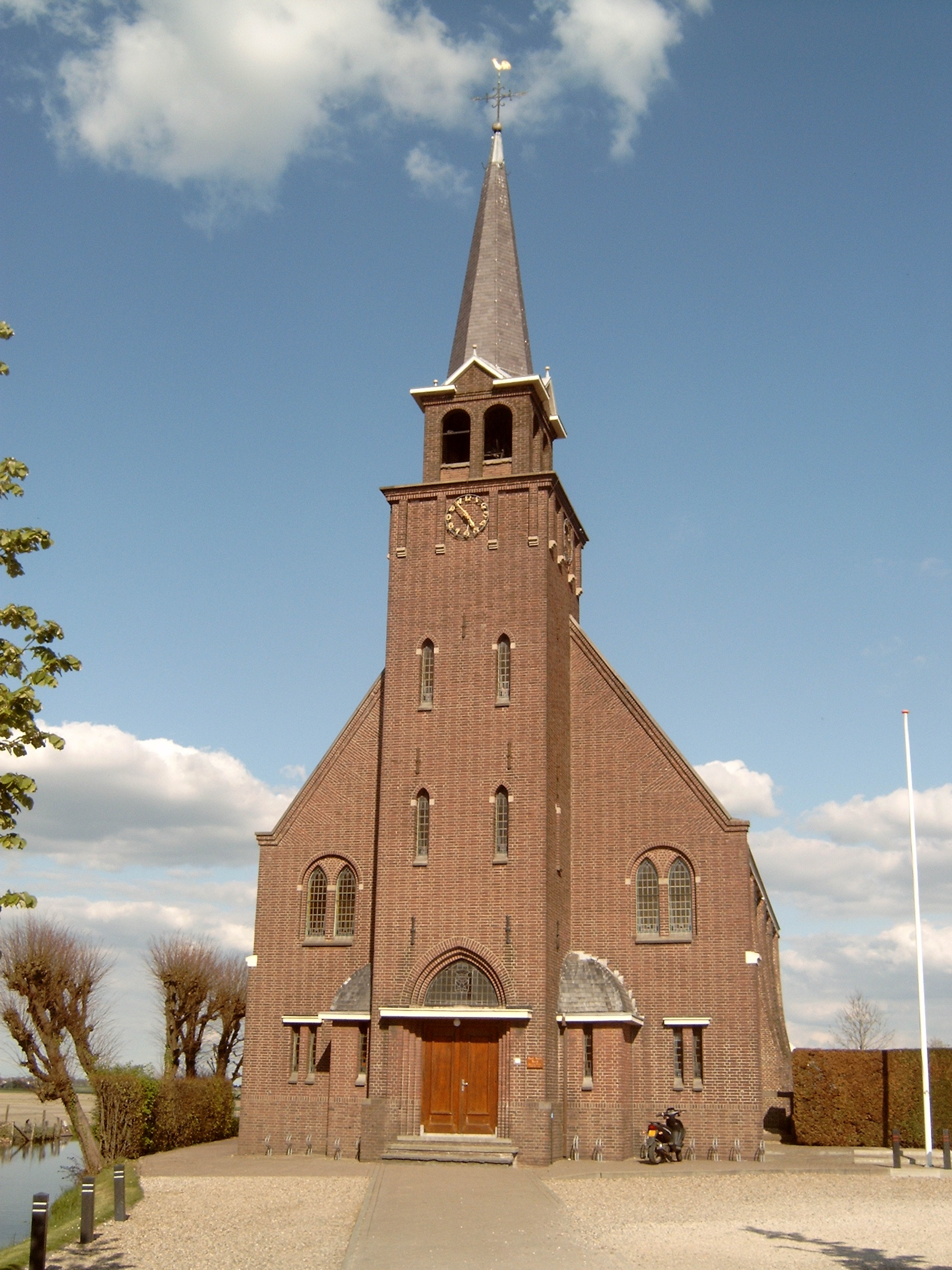
Zevenhoven, church

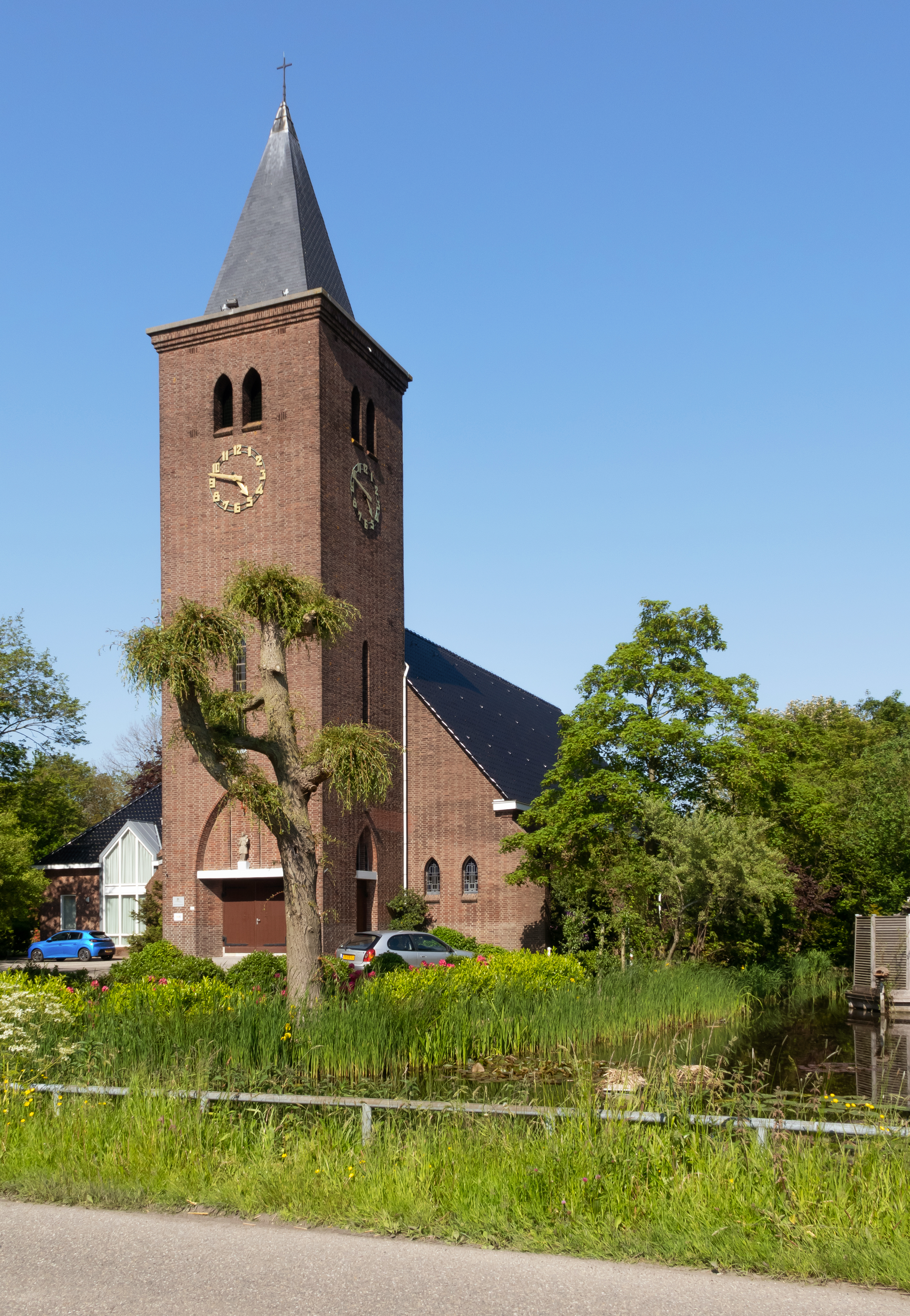
Noordeinde, church

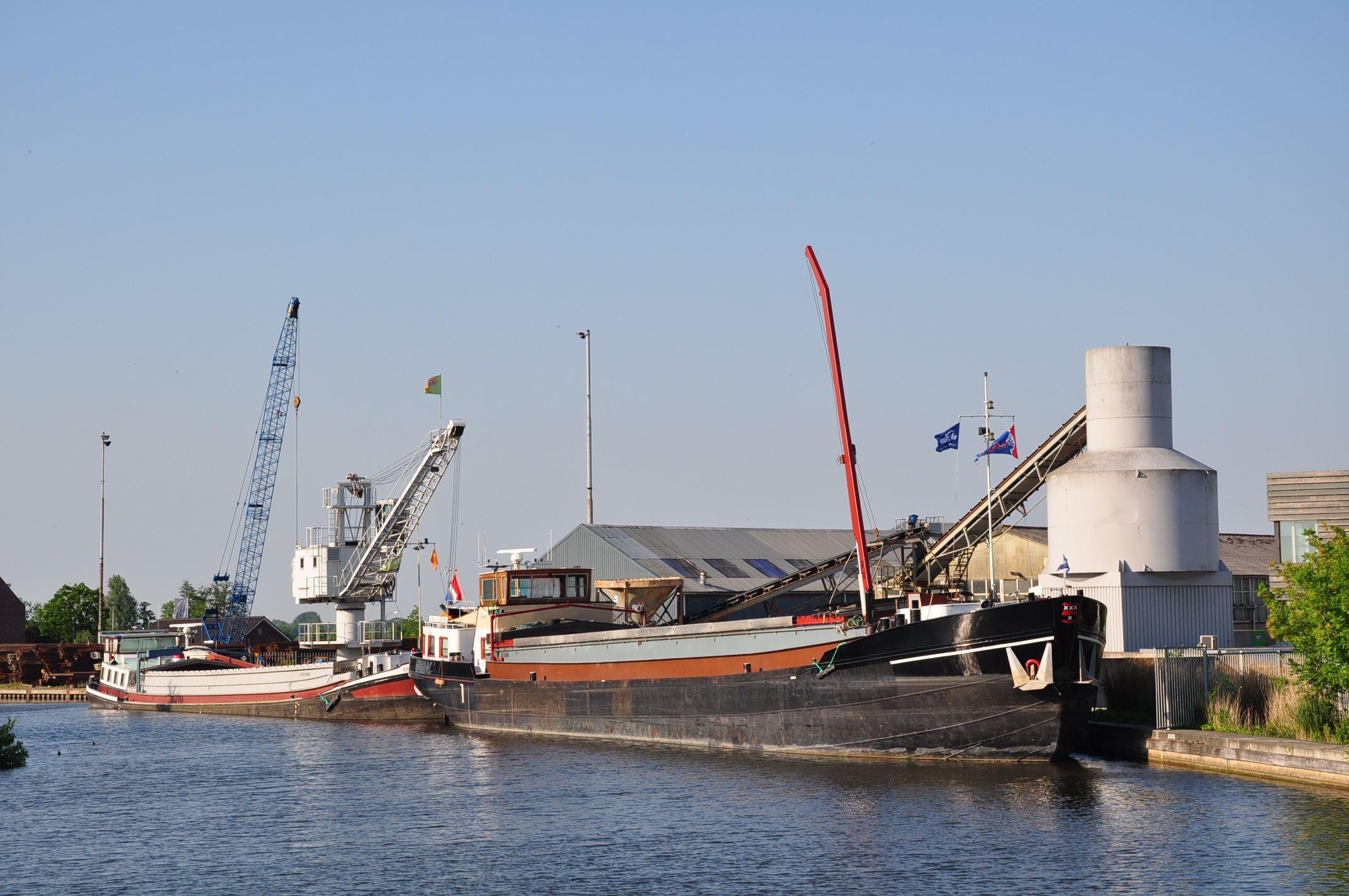
Nieuwkoop, Woerdense Verlaat

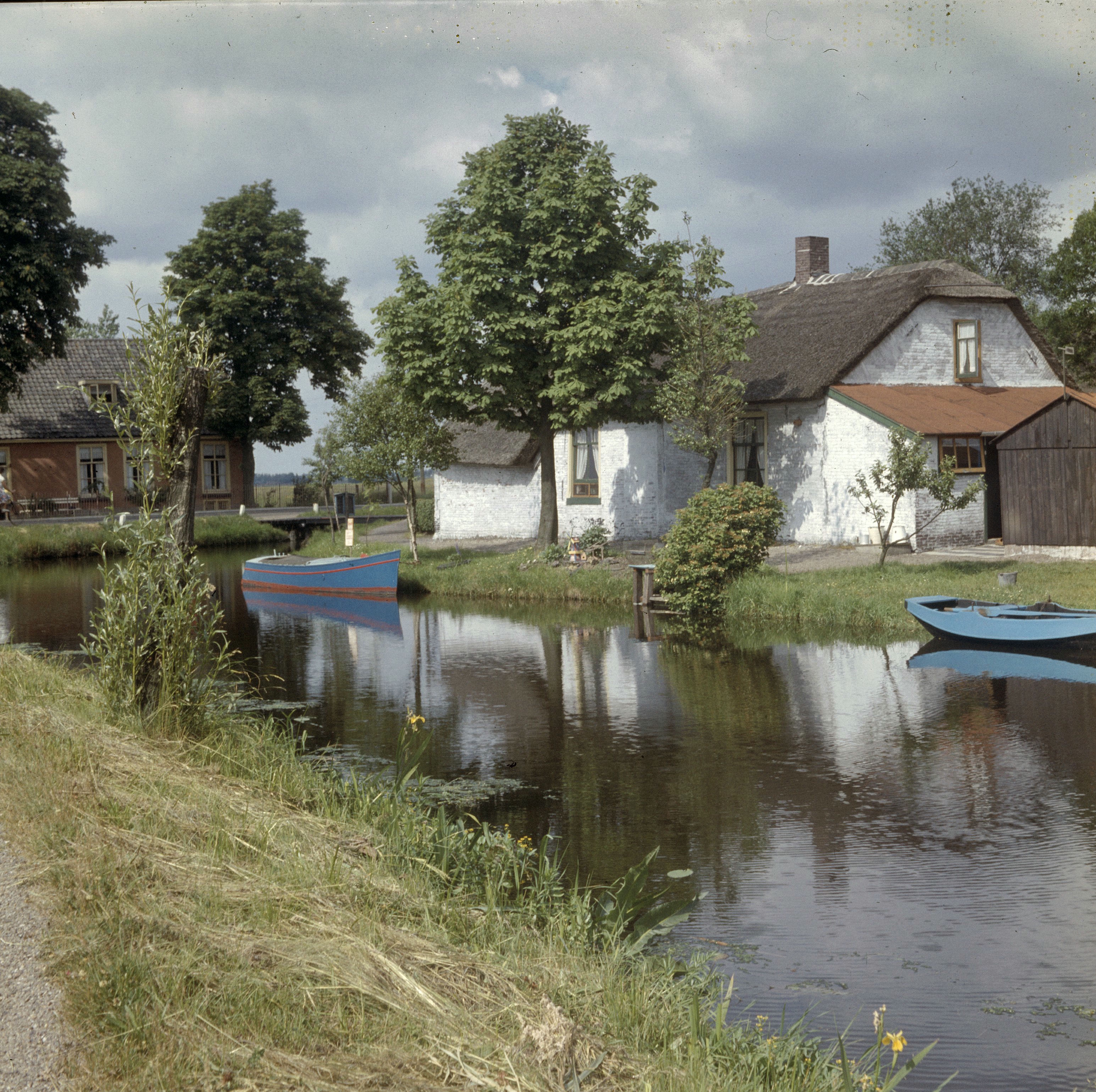
Overzicht van boerderij, vanaf de overzijde van het water, Nieuwkoop

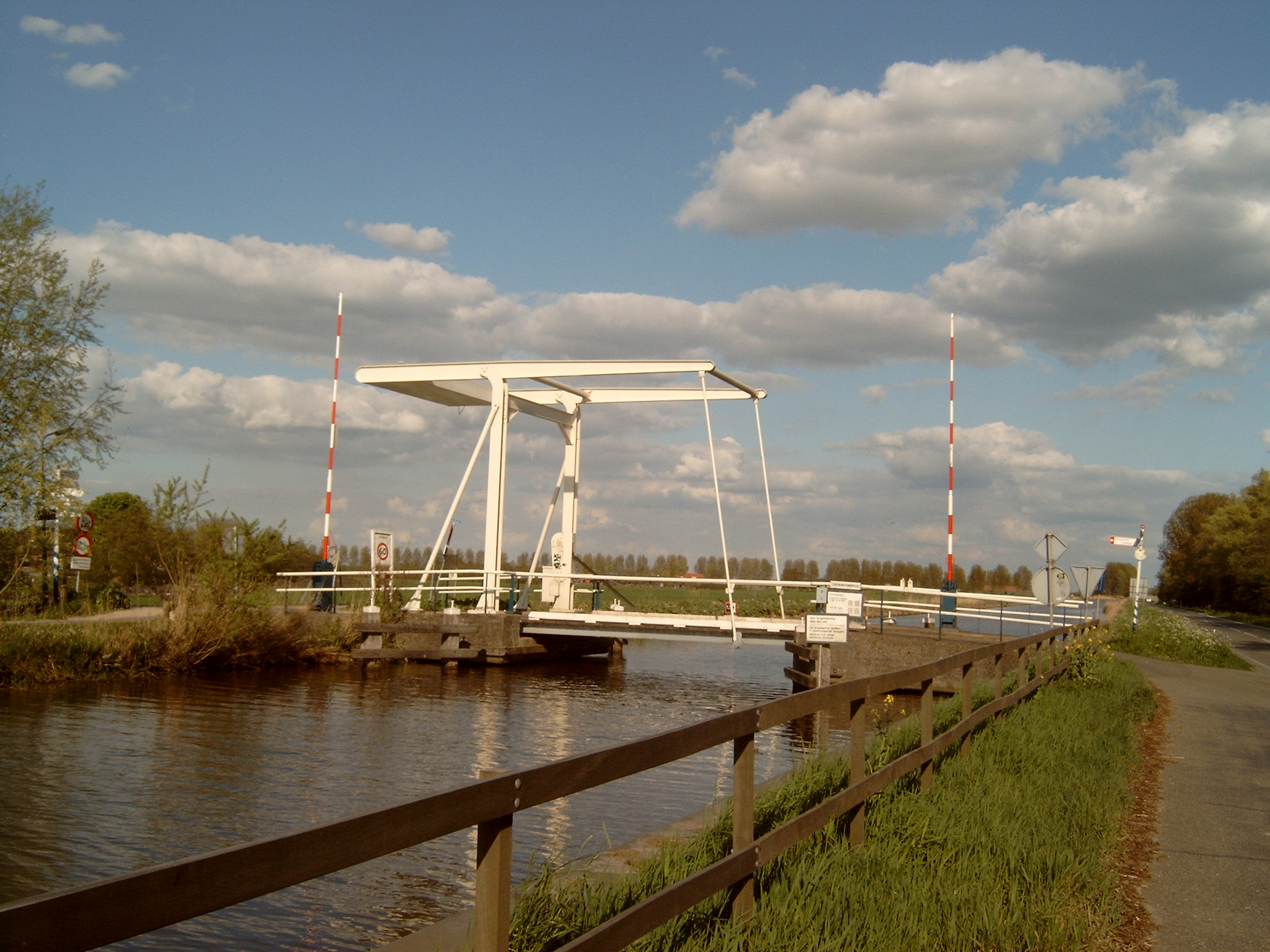
Woerdense Verlaat, drawbridge

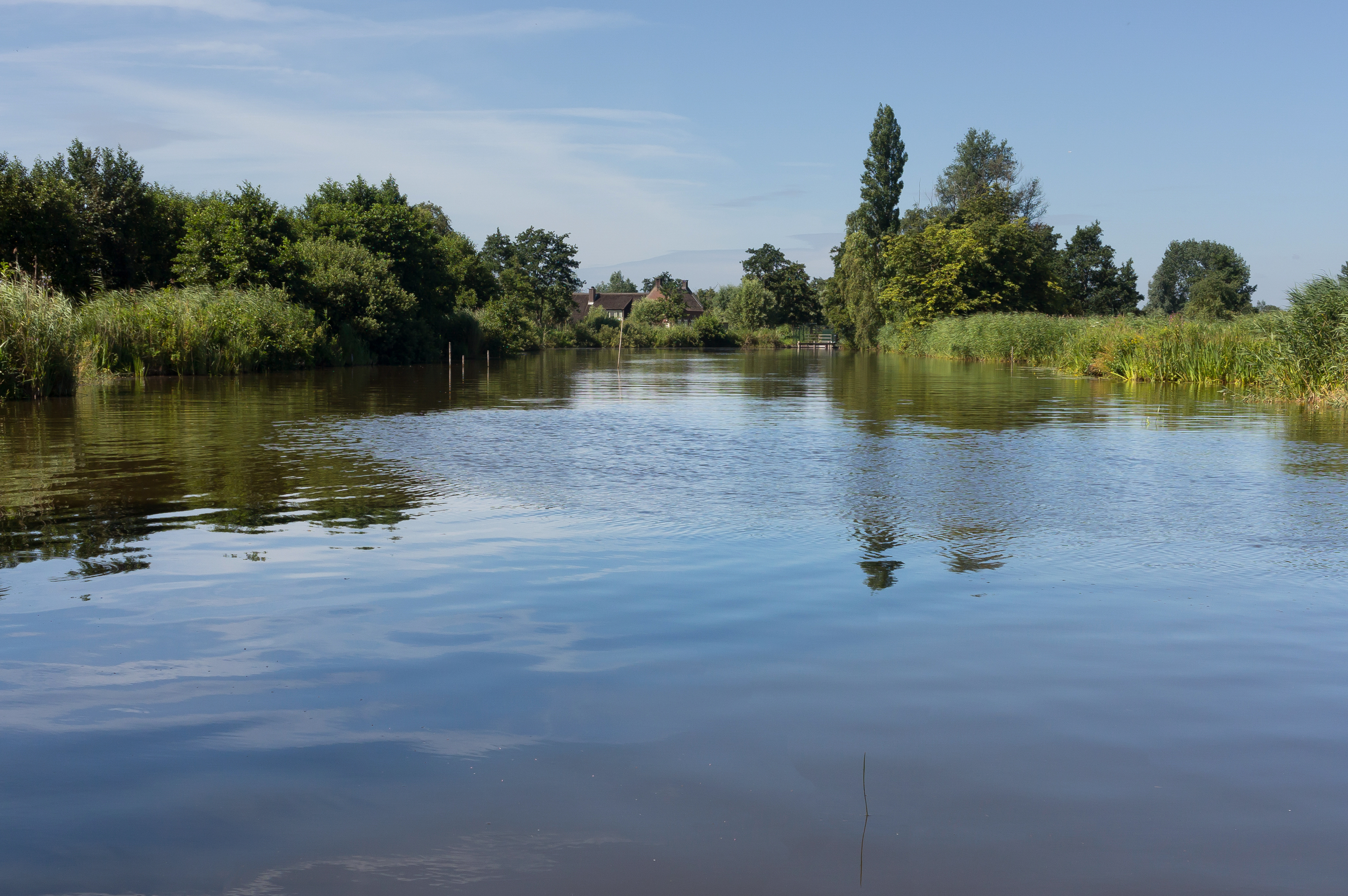
Woerdense Verlaat, river (de Meije) near the Bosweg

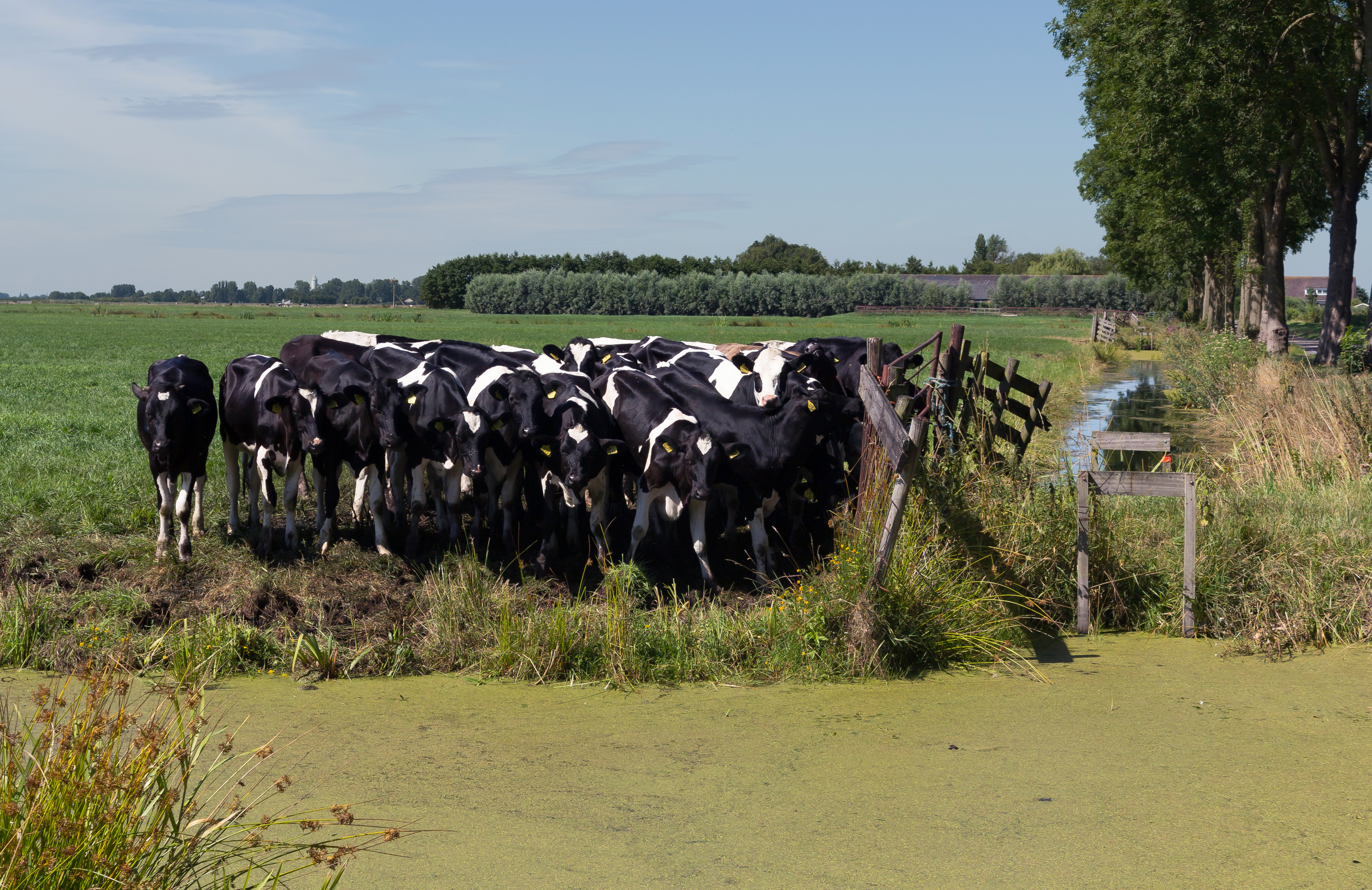
Woerdense Verlaat, cows in pasture along the Bosweg near Lusthof de Haeck
