= Aardam =

- Hamlet
- Location within Netherlands Location within Europe
- Coordinates: 52°9′57″N 4°42′0″E
- Country: Netherlands
- Province: South Holland
- Municipality: Nieuwkoop

Aardam is a former hamlet in the Dutch province of South Holland and is now incorporated into the town Ter Aar, part of the municipality Nieuwkoop.
