= Noorden =

Dutch village

- Village
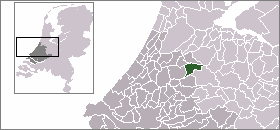

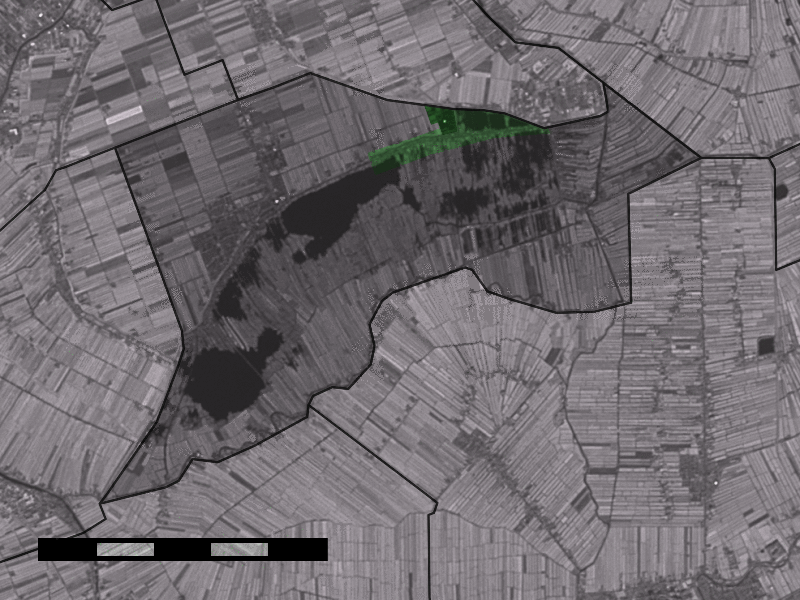
- The town centre (dark green) and the statistical district (light green) of Noorden in the municipality of Nieuwkoop.
- Coordinates: 52°10′N 4°50′E
- Country: Netherlands
- Province: South Holland
- Municipality: Nieuwkoop

Population (2001)
  - Total: 975
- Time zone: UTC+1 (CET)
  - Summer (DST): UTC+2 (CEST)

Noorden is a village in the Dutch province of South Holland. It is a part of the municipality of Nieuwkoop, and lies about 10 km north of Woerden.

In 2001, the town of Noorden had 975 inhabitants. The built-up area of the town was 0.18 km², and contained 337 residences. The statistical area "Noorden", which also can include the peripheral parts of the village, as well as the surrounding countryside, has a population of around 1590.

== Photos ==
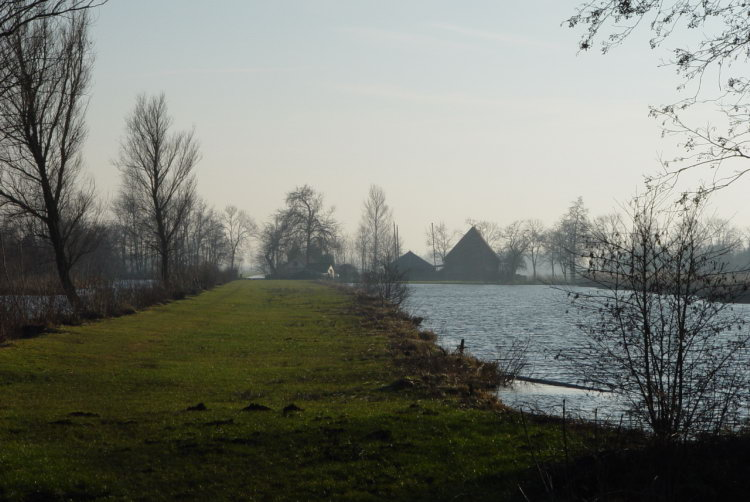

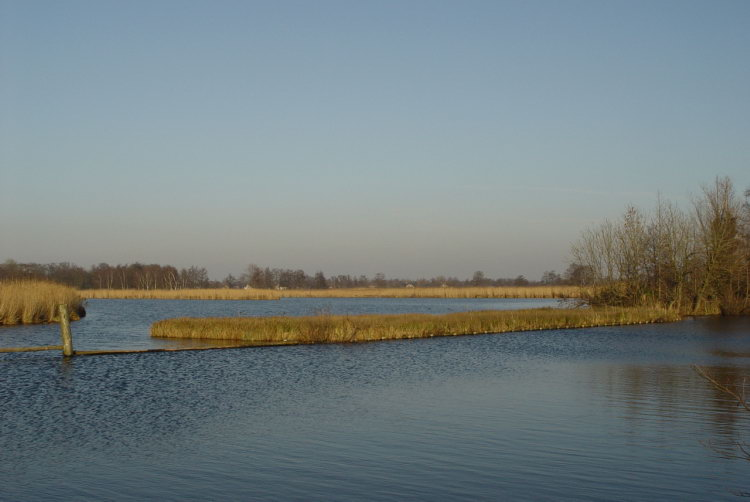

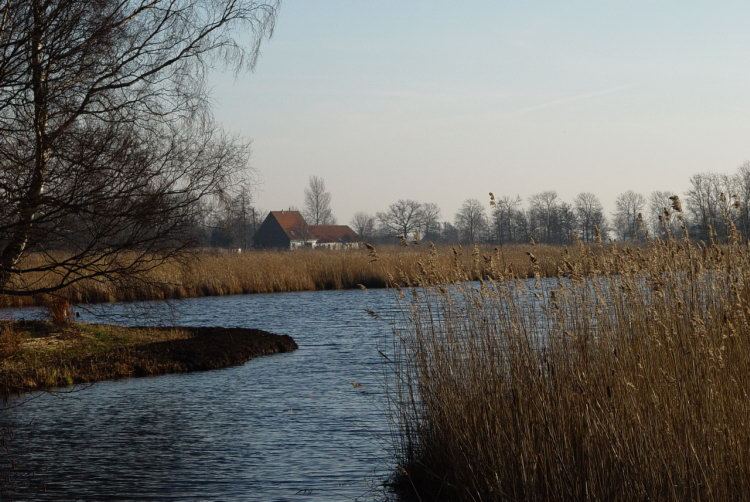

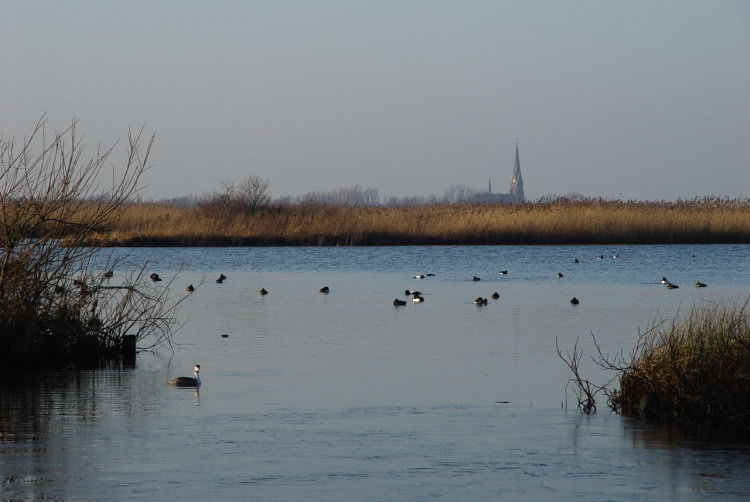

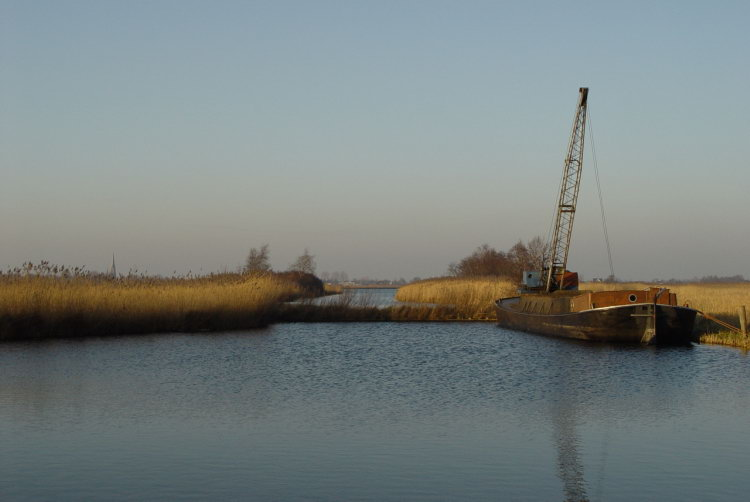

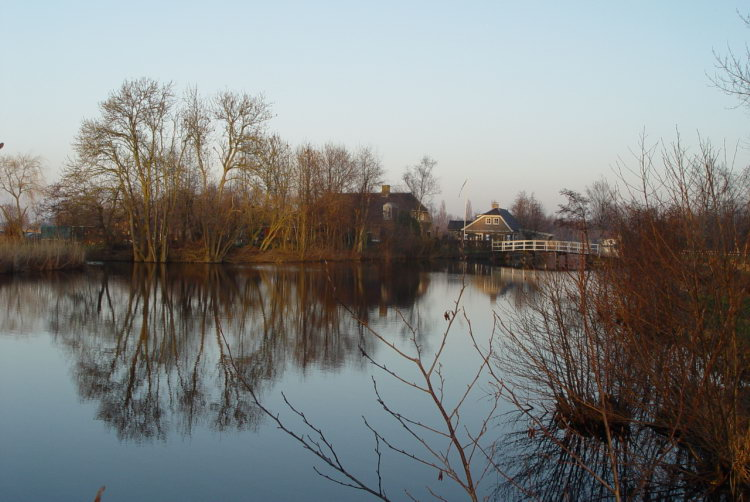

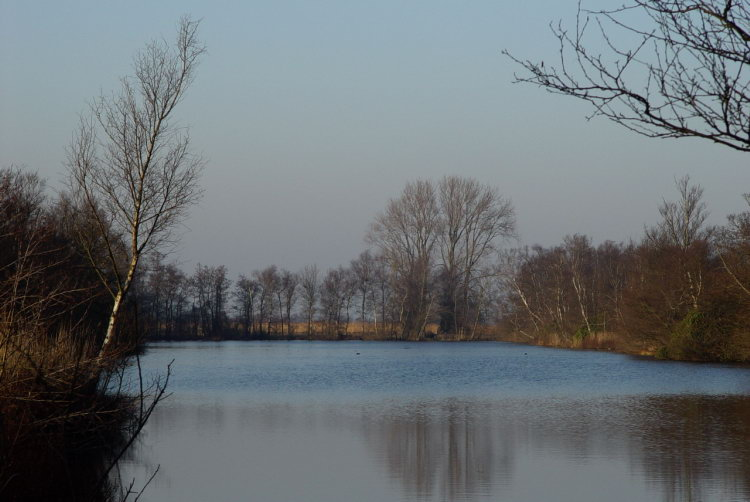
