= Langeraar =

- buurtschap
- Location in South Holland Location in the Netherlands
- Coordinates: 52°11′42″N 4°42′32″E
- Country: Netherlands
- Province: South Holland
- Municipality: Nieuwkoop

Population (2004)
  - Total: 2,310
- Postal code: 2461
- Area code: 0172

Langeraar is a village in the community of Nieuwkoop, which is located in the Nederlandse province of South Holland. The village has 2,310 inhabitants (2004).
