= Zevenhoven =

- Village
- Flag Coat of arms

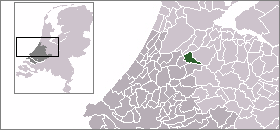

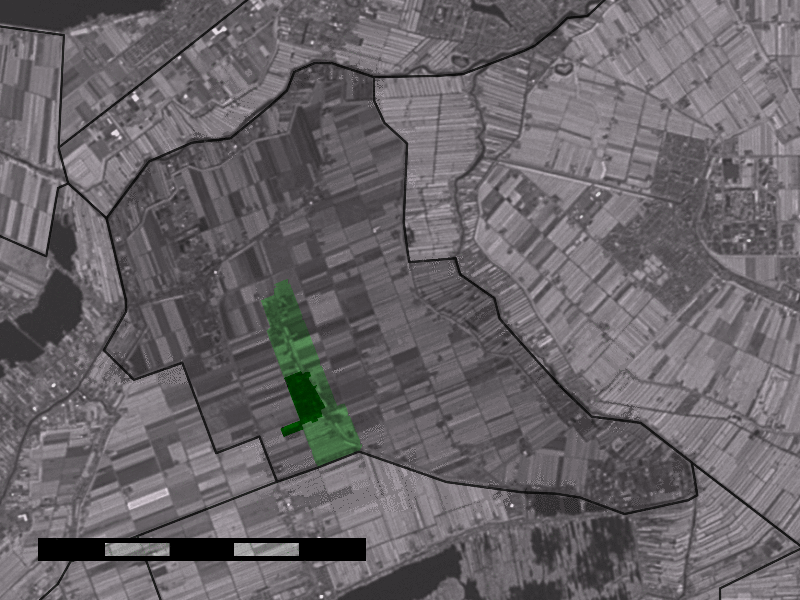
- The village centre (dark green) and the statistical district (light green) of Zevenhoven in the municipality of Liemeer.
- Coordinates: 52°10′57″N 4°46′44″E
- Country: Netherlands
- Province: South Holland
- Municipality: Nieuwkoop

Population (2004)
  - Total: 2,750
- Time zone: UTC+1 (CET)
  - Summer (DST): UTC+2 (CEST)

Zevenhoven is a village in the Dutch province of South Holland. It is a part of the municipality of Nieuwkoop and lies about 9 km northeast of Alphen aan den Rijn.

In 2001 the village of Zevenhoven had 1385 inhabitants. The built-up area of the village was 0.32 km², and contained 509 residences. The statistical area "Zevenhoven", which also can include the peripheral parts of the village, as well as the surrounding countryside, has a population of around 2090.

Zevenhoven was a separate municipality until 1991, when it became part of Nieuwveen.
