= Annunciation (Botticelli, New York) =

C. 1485–1492 painting by Sandro Botticelli

The Annunciation
- Annunciation
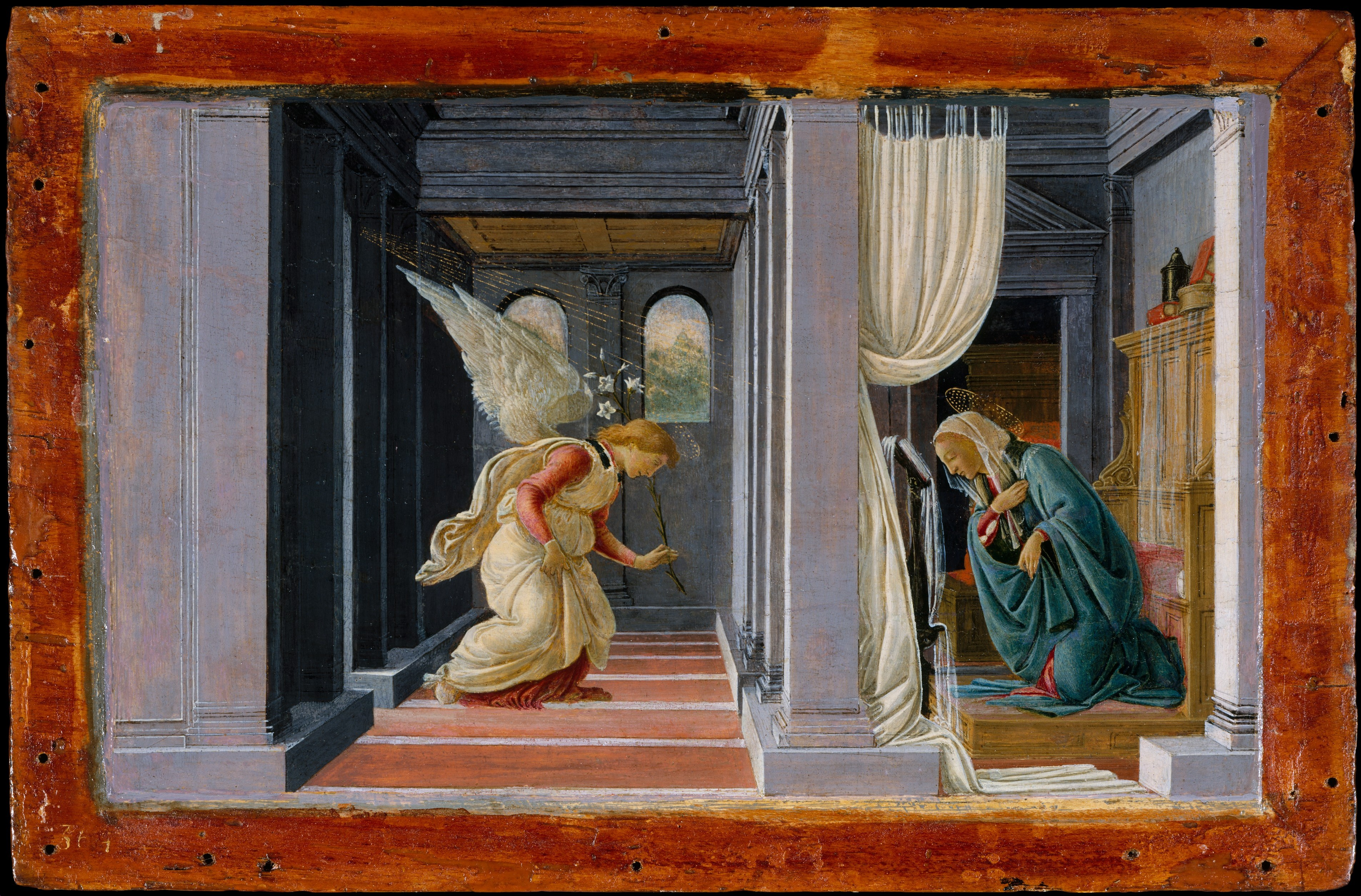
- Artist: Sandro Botticelli
- Year: 15th century
- Medium: tempera, gold leaf, wood
- Subject: Annunciation
- Dimensions: 19.1 cm (7.5 in) × 31.4 cm (12.4 in)
- Location: Metropolitan Museum of Art, Palazzo Barberini
- Owner: Robert Lehman
- Identifiers: The Met object ID: 459016

The Annunciation (c. 1485–1492) is a small painting of the Annunciation by the Italian Renaissance artist Sandro Botticelli. It is now in the collection of the Metropolitan Museum of Art in New York. The Metropolitan believe the work was painted as a single image for private devotional use, rather than as one of a set of predella scenes below the main panel of an altarpiece.

The work is known to have been in the Barberini family collection in Rome in the 17th century, and later became part of the Robert Lehman Collection that was donated to the Metropolitan Museum of Art in 1969.

Boticelli also painted the Cestello Annunciation about the same time for Santa Maria Maddalena dei Pazzi, and also an Annunciation for San Barnaba, Florence, now in the Kelvingrove Art Gallery and Museum in Glasgow, Scotland.

== See also ==
- List of works by Sandro Botticelli
