= Cestello Annunciation =

Painting by Sandro Botticelli

The Annunciation
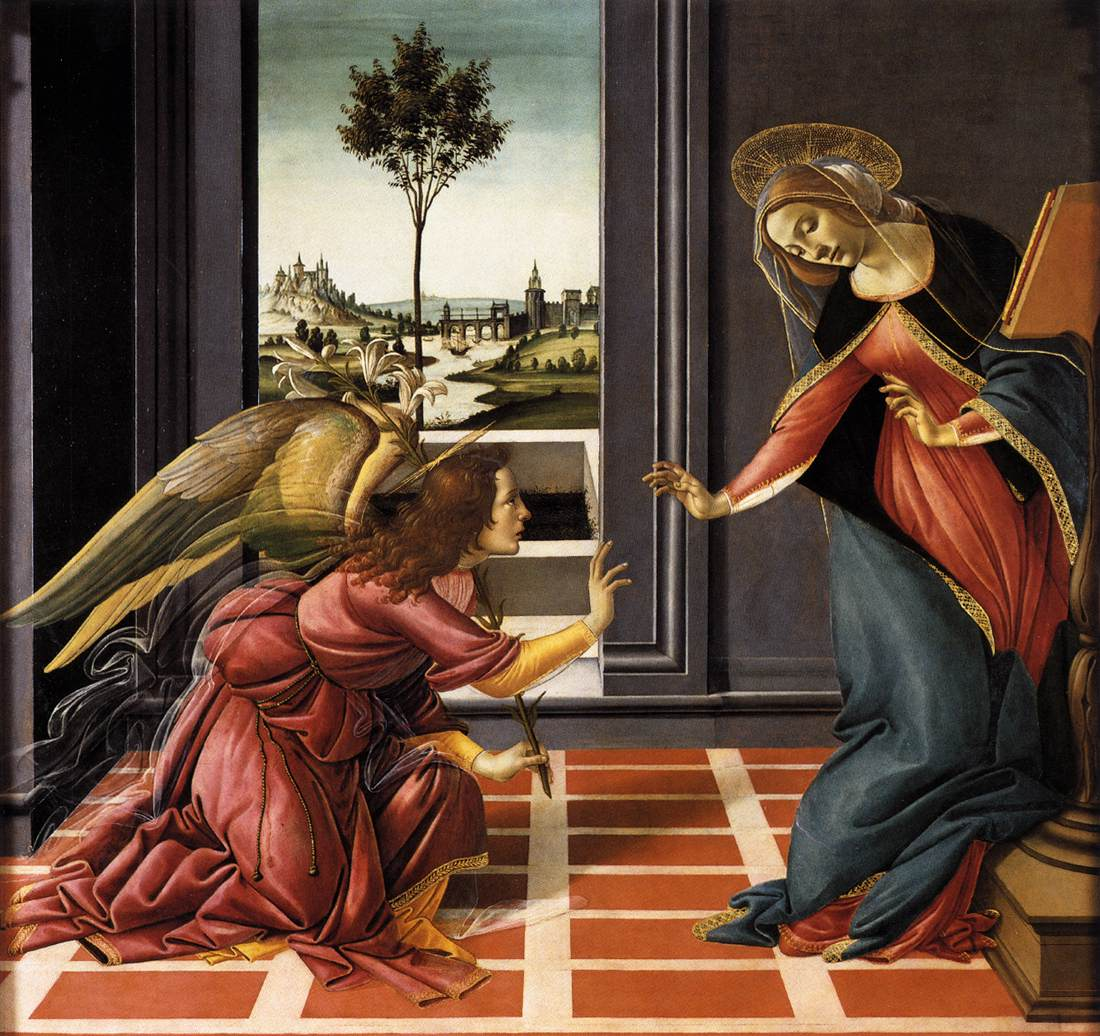
- Artist: Sandro Botticelli
- Year: 1489
- Medium: Tempera on panel
- Dimensions: 150 cm × 156 cm (59 in × 61 in)
- Location: Uffizi, Florence

The Cestello Annunciation is a tempera painting on panel made in 1489 by the Italian Renaissance master Sandro Botticelli. It was painted for the patron Benedetto di Ser Giovanni Guardi to adorn the church of the Florentine monastery of Cestello, which is now known as Santa Maria Maddalena de'Pazzi.

The subject of the painting is the Annunciation, in which the Archangel Gabriel visits the Virgin Mary to 'announce' to her (hence 'Annunciation') that she has been chosen by God to bear the Christ child should she accept this invitation. Her 'fiat' (Let it be done to me) is the Annunciation. If She had said no, there would be no Redemption for mankind. Underneath the painting on its original frame are words in Latin from St. Luke's Gospel 1:35: "The Holy Ghost shall come upon thee, and the power of the Highest shall overshadow thee."

The subject of the Annunciation is common in Christian art and has been depicted by many artists, in multiple formats, and in different time periods. In addition to the Cestello Annunciation, Botticelli also painted a 1485 Annunciation now in the Metropolitan Museum of Art and a 1495-1500 version now housed in the Kelvingrove Art Gallery and Museum.

== See also ==
- List of works by Sandro Botticelli
