= The Annunciation (Tanner) =

Painting by Henry Ossawa Tanner

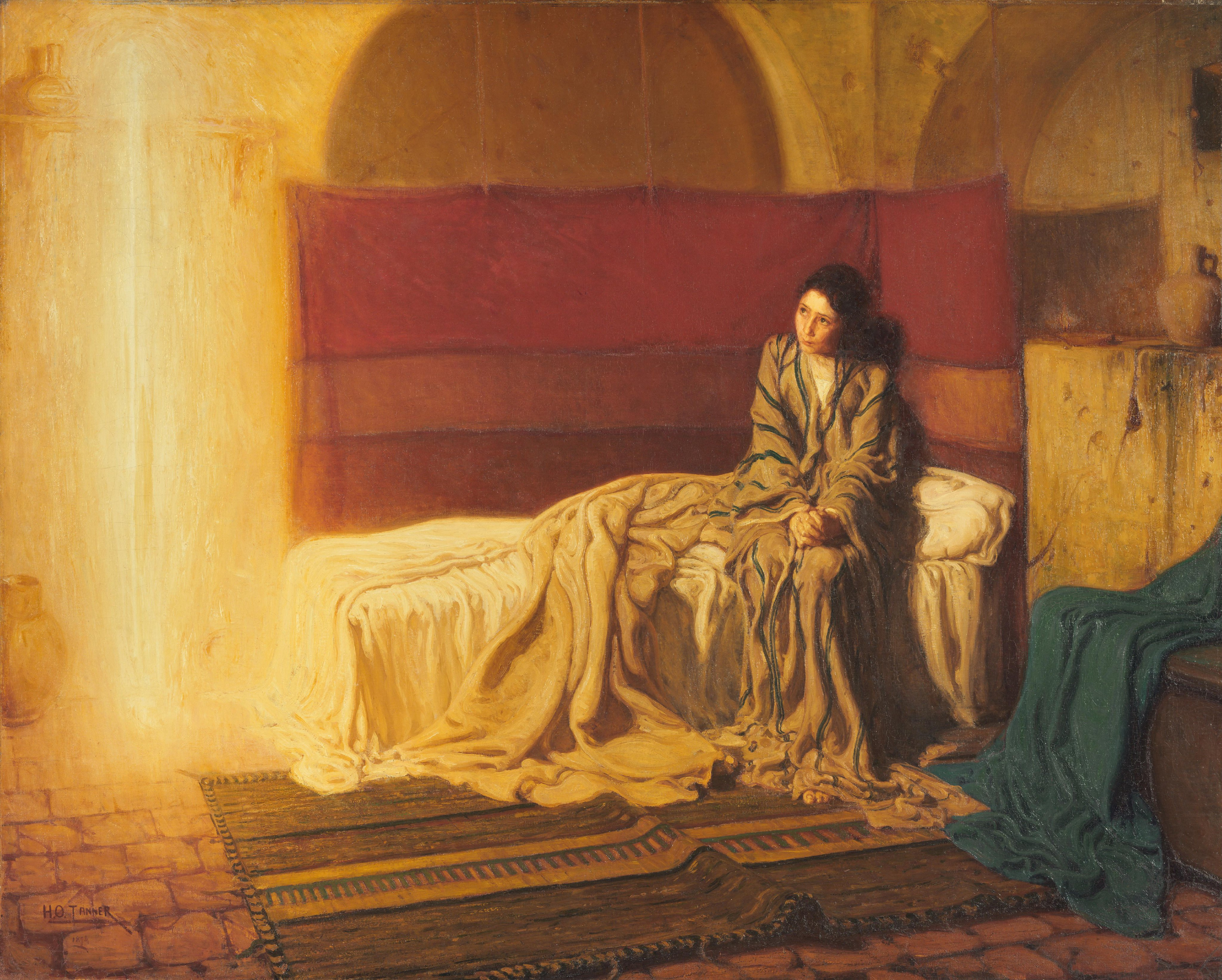
- Artist: Henry Ossawa Tanner
- Year: 1898
- Medium: oil on canvas
- Dimensions: 140 cm × 181.0 cm (57 in × 71.25 in)
- Location: Philadelphia Museum of Art, Philadelphia

The Annunciation is an 1898 painting by the African-American painter Henry Ossawa Tanner. It depicts the biblical scene of the Annunciation, where the archangel Gabriel visits Mary to announce that she will give birth to Jesus. The painting is held by the Philadelphia Museum of Art.

== Description ==
The painting features the archangel Gabriel and Mary during the Annunciation. The event is narrated in Luke 1:26–38, in which Gabriel tells Mary that she will bear Jesus, the Son of God. Tanner uses a column of light to depict Gabriel and paints Mary in peasant clothing with no halo or other discernible holy attributes. This subject treatment differs greatly from other paintings of the Annunciation, such as Dante Gabriel Rossetti's Ecce Ancilla Domini! (1850), which a contemporary critic claimed they saw a reminder of in Tanner's The Annunciation. The room where the scene takes place is furnished with textiles, ceramics, and stone flooring—elements that would reappear in Tanner's later biblical paintings.

== Background ==
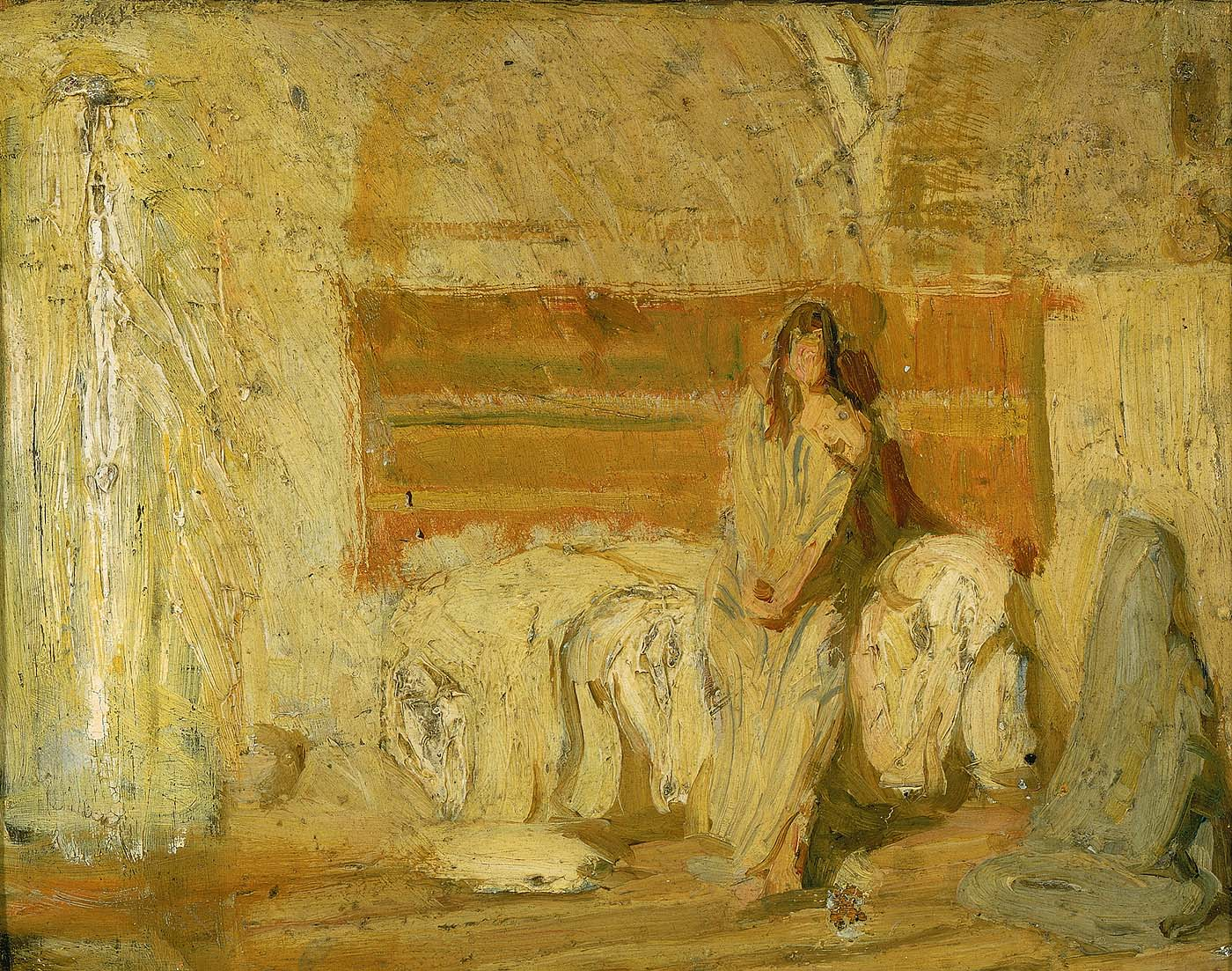
Study for The Annunciation

Prior to painting biblical subjects, Tanner made two genre paintings depicting African Americans: The Banjo Lesson (1893) and The Thankful Poor (1894). However, he took a new direction following the completion of the latter. According to scholar and family friend William S. Scarborough, Tanner "had always been strongly religious" and that "it had long been the wish of his father's (Note: Tanner's father, Benjamin Tucker Tanner, was a bishop in the African Methodist Episcopal Church and had originally tried to discourage his son's interest in art.) heart that his son should paint Biblical subjects..." As a result, Tanner pursued religious painting, a field that was "ripe for commercial exploitation" at the time. One of his first religious paintings was Daniel in the Lion's Den followed two years later by The Resurrection of Lazarus. Both paintings were exhibited at the Paris Salon and won distinctions.

In 1897, Tanner embarked on a trip to Egypt and Palestine. The trip was sponsored by Rodman Wanamaker, whose comment that "in the Orient the light, both interior and exterior, the mannerisms of the people, the costumes and habits of living, all are vastly different from anything that could be imagined in the West" likely influenced Tanner's development of The Annunciation and subsequent settings of his religious paintings.

Tanner intended for The Annunciation to be his entry for the 1898 Paris Salon. Following the success of his The Resurrection of Lazarus the year prior, Tanner perhaps desired to attract more viewers in the 1898 Salon. As such, Tanner chose the largest canvas size of his career for The Annunciation. He was unsatisfied with the first version, however, believing that "there seemed no other way out of the difficulty than to commence a new one." The final version of The Annunciation has been described as "very close" to a study that is in the Smithsonian American Art Museum.

Though it has been suggested that Tanner's eventual wife Jessie Olssen served as the model for the painting's Mary, Sewell & Mosby note that Tanner likely did not meet Olssen until after the painting's Salon exhibition.

== Reception ==
Contemporary reviews of The Annunciation at the 1898 Salon have not been found, but later accounts show that the painting enjoyed an enthusiastic reception. One writer reports that it "proved one of the great successes of the year ... It is said that when this picture was brought before the jury of admission that a storm of 'bravos' burst forth." In a May 1898 letter to Tanner, Harrison S. Morris, managing director of the Pennsylvania Academy of the Fine Arts, congratulated Tanner, writing "The Annunciation seems to be a fitting sequel to Lazarus and it is most gratifying to read the unstinted praise which you modestly enclosed." Morris again praised the work when it was exhibited at the Art Institute of Chicago in 1898, describing The Annunciation as "very impressive and beautiful." An early 1899 exhibition at the Pennsylvania Academy was also met with praise, including from one critic in The Philadelphia Inquirer who called the work a "brilliant masterpiece."

In January 1899, the painting was sold to Rodman Wanamaker, mainly to provide Tanner with income. Prominent Philadelphia art collector John Q. Johnson saw the painting at the Pennsylvania Academy and, as the chairman of the acquisition committee, acquired the painting for the Wilstach Collection on April 5, 1899 for $1,750. Because the collection is part of the Philadelphia Museum of Art, The Annunciation is Tanner's first work to be purchased by an American museum.

== See also ==
- List of paintings by Henry Ossawa Tanner
