= Annunciation in Christian art =

Subject in art

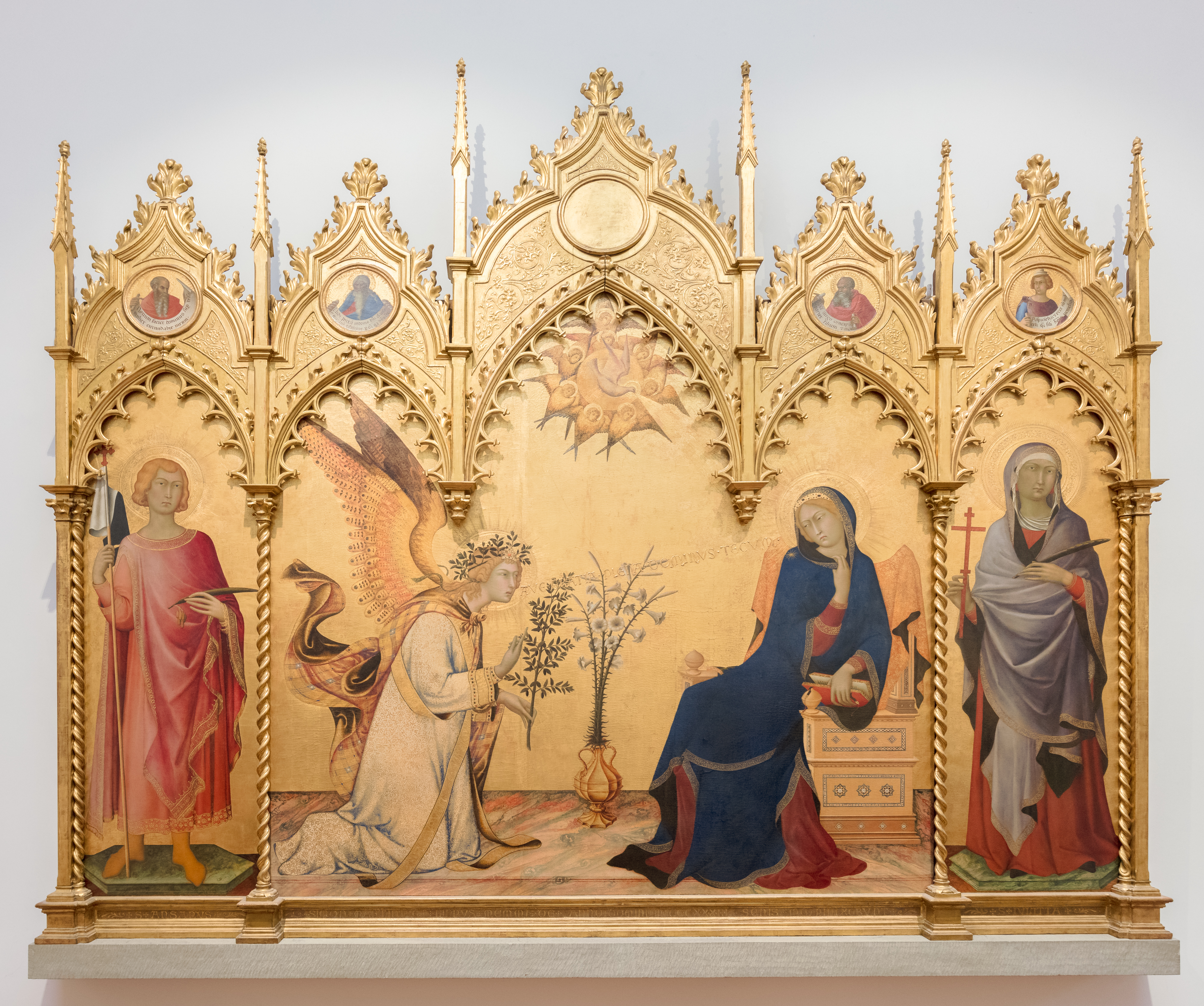
The Virgin shrinks back in reluctance in the Annunciation with Sts. Margaret and Ansanus, by Simone Martini and Lippo Memmi, 1333

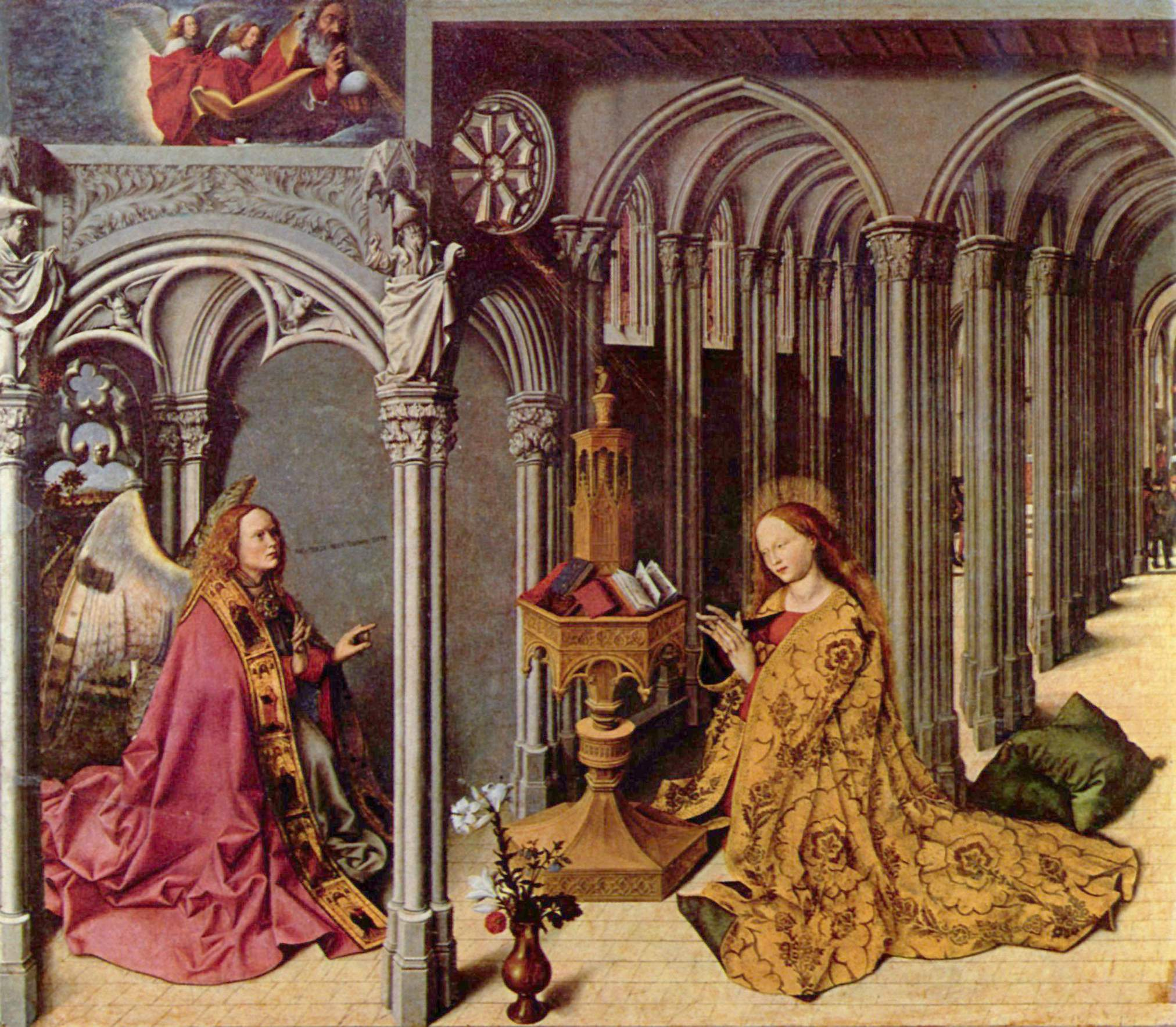
Aix Annunciation, generally attributed to Barthélemy d'Eyck, c. 1443–1445

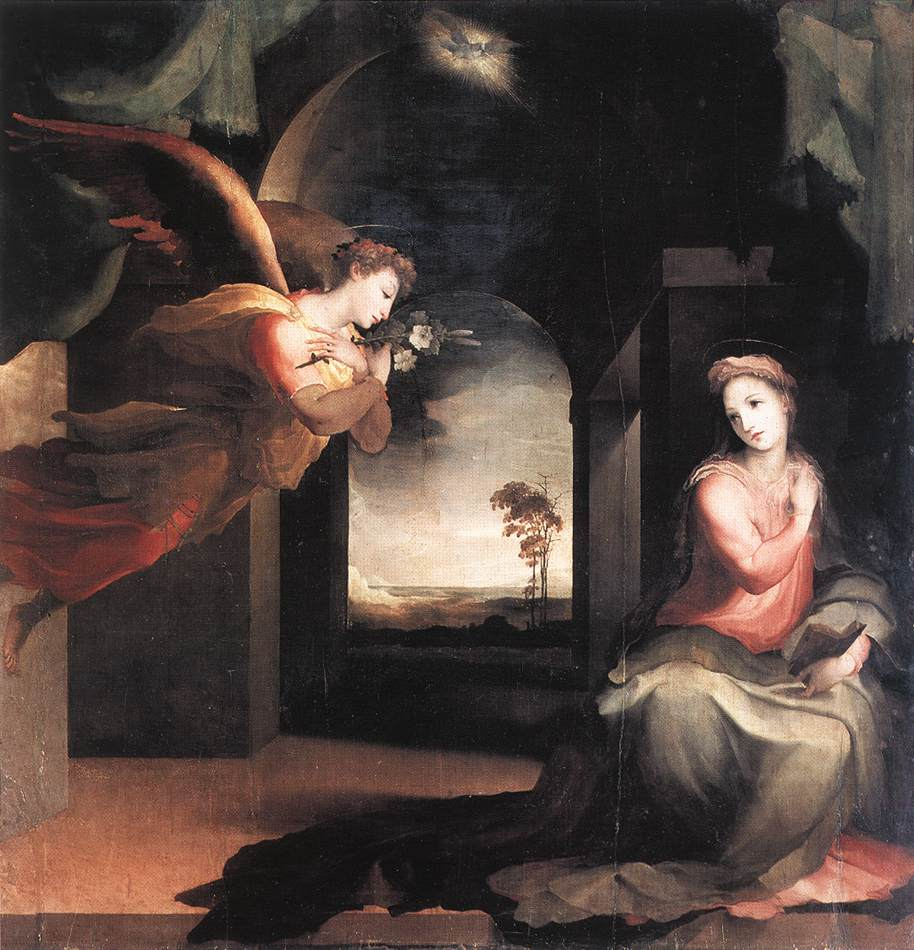
Domenico Beccafumi, 1545

The Annunciation has been one of the most frequent subjects of Christian art. Depictions of the Annunciation go back to early Christianity, with the Priscilla catacomb in Rome including the oldest known fresco of the Annunciation, dating to the 4th century.

Scenes depicting the Annunciation represent the perpetual virginity of Mary via the announcement by the angel Gabriel that Mary would conceive a child to be born the son of God.

The scene is an invariable one in cycles of the Life of the Virgin, and often included as the initial scene in those of the Life of Christ. Frescos depicting this scene have appeared in Roman Catholic Marian churches for centuries, and it has been a topic addressed by many artists in multiple media, ranging from stained glass to mosaic, to relief, to sculpture to oil painting.

== Middle Ages and Renaissance ==
Particularly popular during the Middle Ages and Renaissance, it appears in the work of almost all of the great masters. The figures of the Virgin Mary and the archangel Gabriel, were favorite subjects of Roman Catholic Marian art. Works on the subject have been created by Sandro Botticelli, Leonardo da Vinci, Caravaggio, Duccio di Buoninsegna, Jan van Eyck, Murillo, and thousands of other artists. The mosaics of Pietro Cavallini in Santa Maria in Trastevere in Rome (1291), the frescos of Giotto in the Scrovegni Chapel in Padua (1303), Domenico Ghirlandaio's fresco at the church of Santa Maria Novella in Florence (1486), and Donatello's gilded sculpture at the church of Santa Croce, Florence (1435) are famous examples.

The composition of depictions is very consistent, with Gabriel, normally standing on the left, facing the Virgin, who is generally seated or kneeling, at least in later depictions. Typically, Gabriel is shown in near-profile, while the Virgin faces more to the front. She is usually shown indoors, or in a porch of some kind, in which case Gabriel may be outside the building entirely, in the Renaissance often in a garden, which refers to the hortus conclusus, sometimes an explicit setting for Annunciations. The building is sometimes clearly the Virgin's home, but is also often intended to represent the Jerusalem Temple, as some legendary accounts placed the scene there. The Virgin may be shown reading, as medieval legend dating back to at least the time of the Church Fathers in Ambrose represented her as a considerable scholar, or engaged in a domestic task, often reflecting another legend that she was one of a number of virgins asked to weave a new Veil of the Temple. Late medieval commentators distinguished several phases of the Virgin's reaction to the appearance of Gabriel and the news, from initial alarm at the sudden vision, followed by reluctance to fulfill the role, to a final acceptance. These are reflected in art by the Virgin's posture and expression.

In Late Medieval and Early Renaissance depictions, the grace of the Virgin in God's sight may be indicated by rays falling on her, typically through a window, as light passing through a window was a frequent metaphor in devotional writing for her virginal conception of Jesus. Sometimes a small figure of God the Father or the Holy Spirit as a dove is seen in the air, as the source of the rays. Less common examples feature other biblical figures in the scene. Gabriel, especially in northern Europe, is often shown wearing the vestments of a deacon on a grand feast day, with a cope fastened at the centre with a large morse (brooch). Especially in Early Netherlandish painting, images may contain very complex programmes of visual references, with a number of domestic objects having significance in reinforcing the theology of the event. Well-known examples are the Mérode Altarpiece of Robert Campin, and the Annunciation by Jan van Eyck in Washington.

== Byzantine Rite ==
Byzantine Rite icons display, as is usual, even more consistent compositions than medieval Western images. The Virgin is nearly always on the right, normally either standing or seated on a throne with a building behind her; there are also often buildings visible behind Gabriel. These styles were generally copied in the West until a surprisingly late date, around the 13th century; more varied Western depictions were slower to develop than with other standard religious subjects.

Because of the natural composition of the scene as two figures facing each other, the subject was often employed in the decoration of a diptych or tympaneum (decorated arch above a doorway). In churches of the Byzantine Rite, the Annunciation is typically depicted on the Holy Doors (decorative doorway leading from the nave into the sanctuary), and in the West the two figures are also found on different surfaces, in the outer panels of polyptychs that have an open and closed view, the doors of tabernacles, or simply on facing pages in illuminated manuscripts or different compartments of large altarpieces.

== Gallery of artworks ==
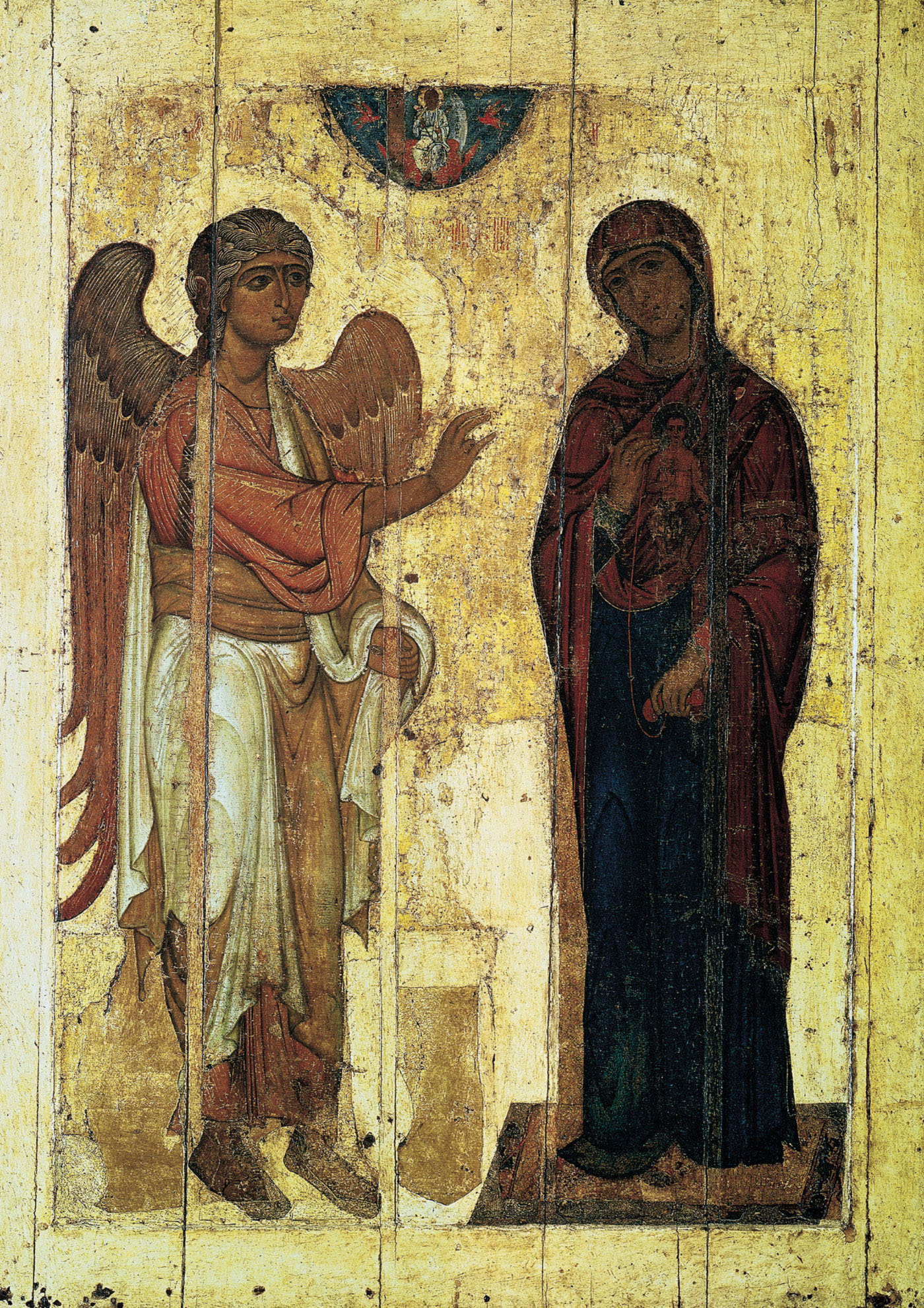
Annunciation of Ustyug, 12th century

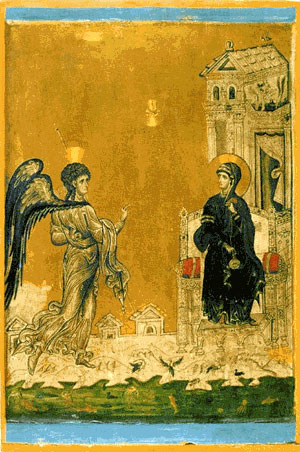
13th-century Byzantine icon, Saint Catherine's Monastery

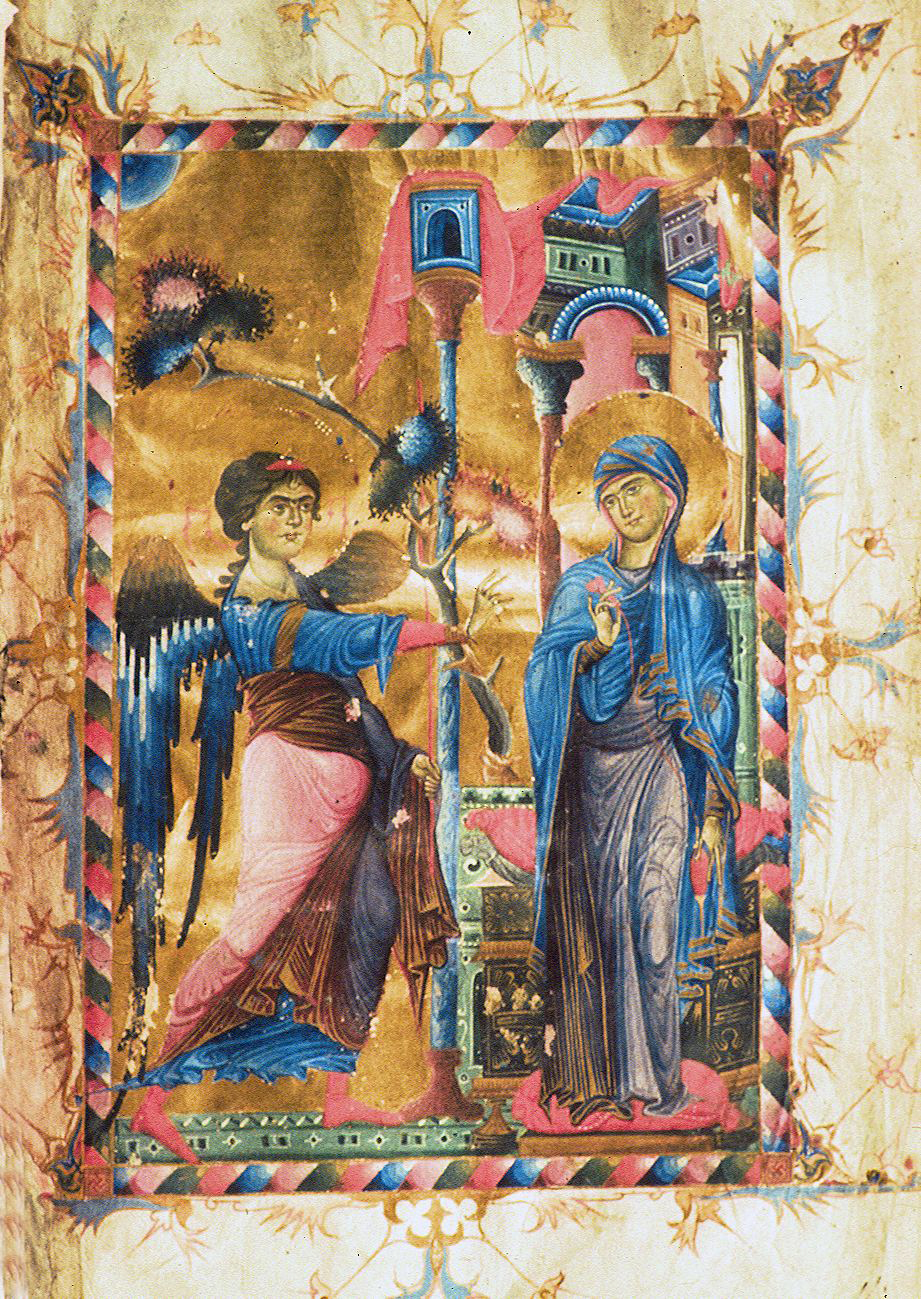
Armenian illumination from the Gospel (1287, Matenadaran).

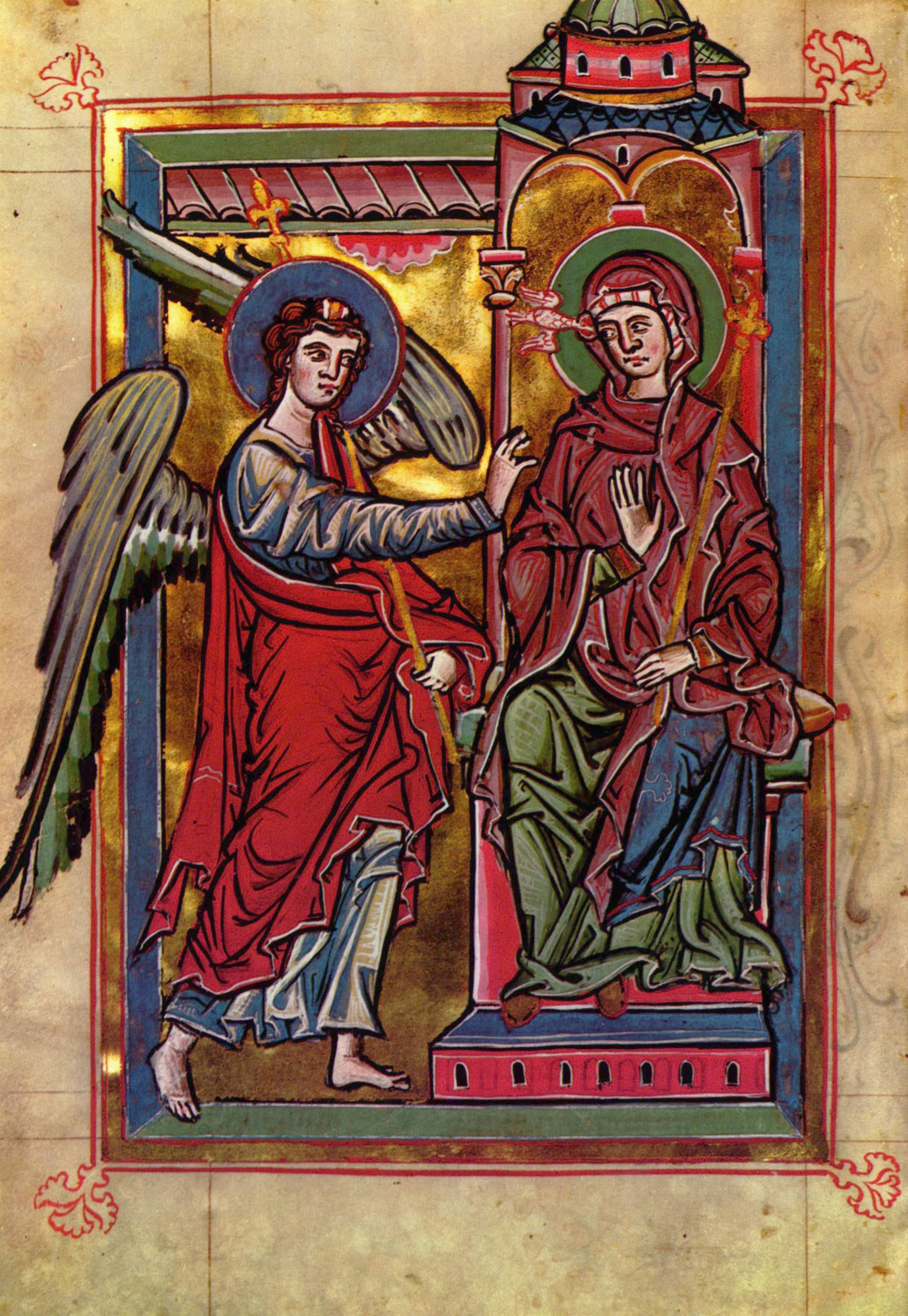
German miniature of c. 1275, still closely following Byzantine models

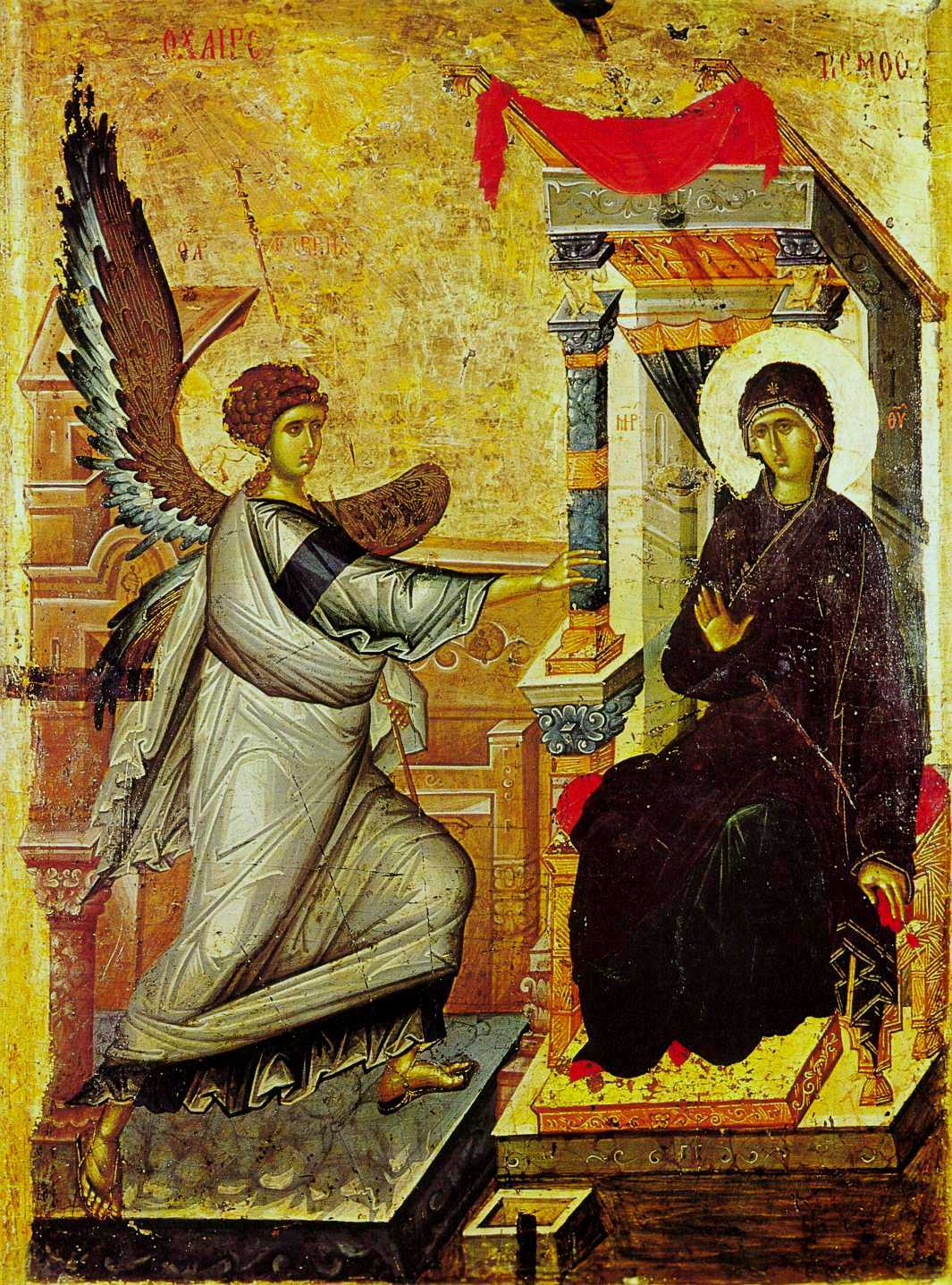
Byzantine icon, early 14th century

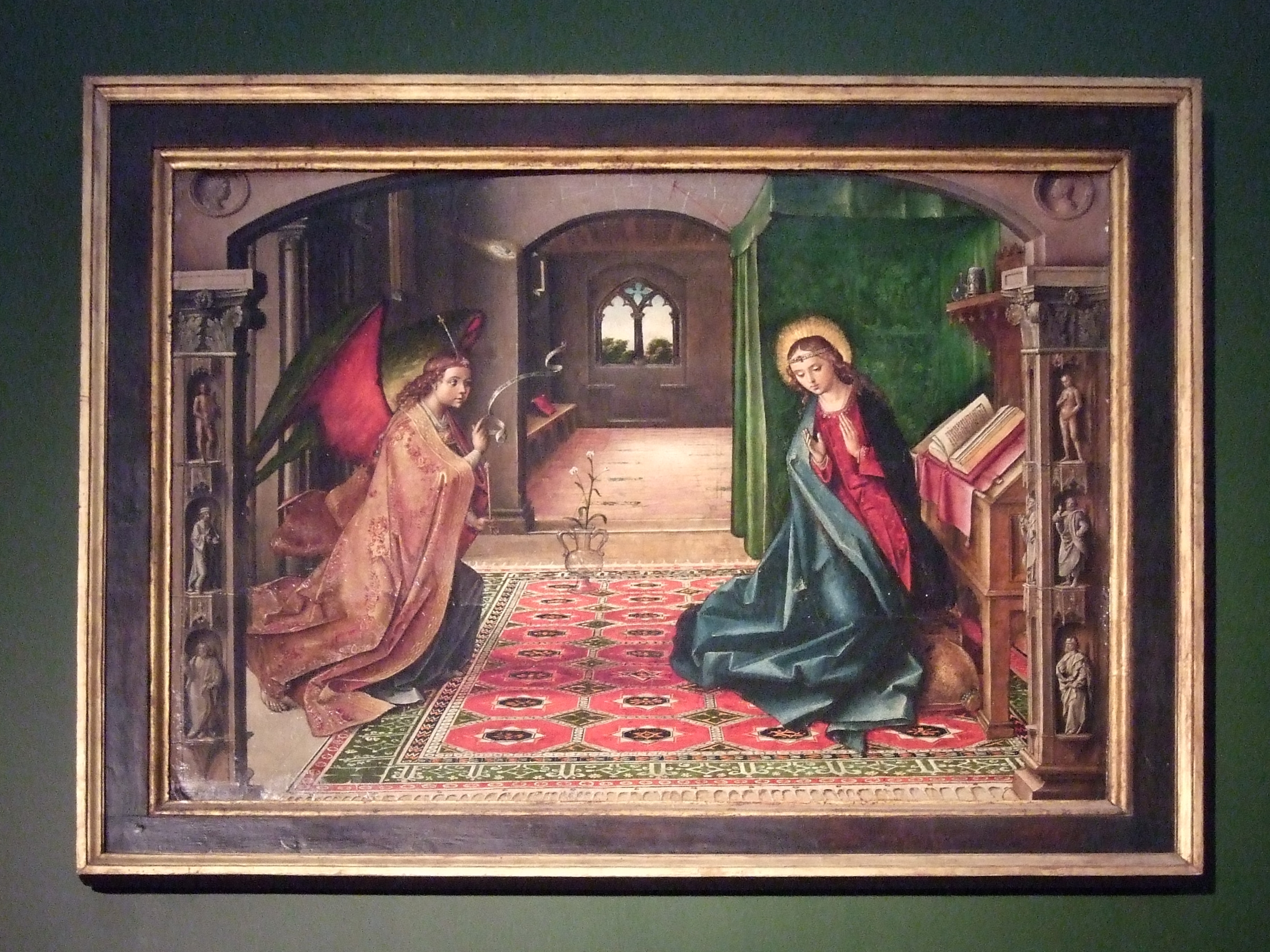
Annunciation by Pedro Berruguete, 15th century

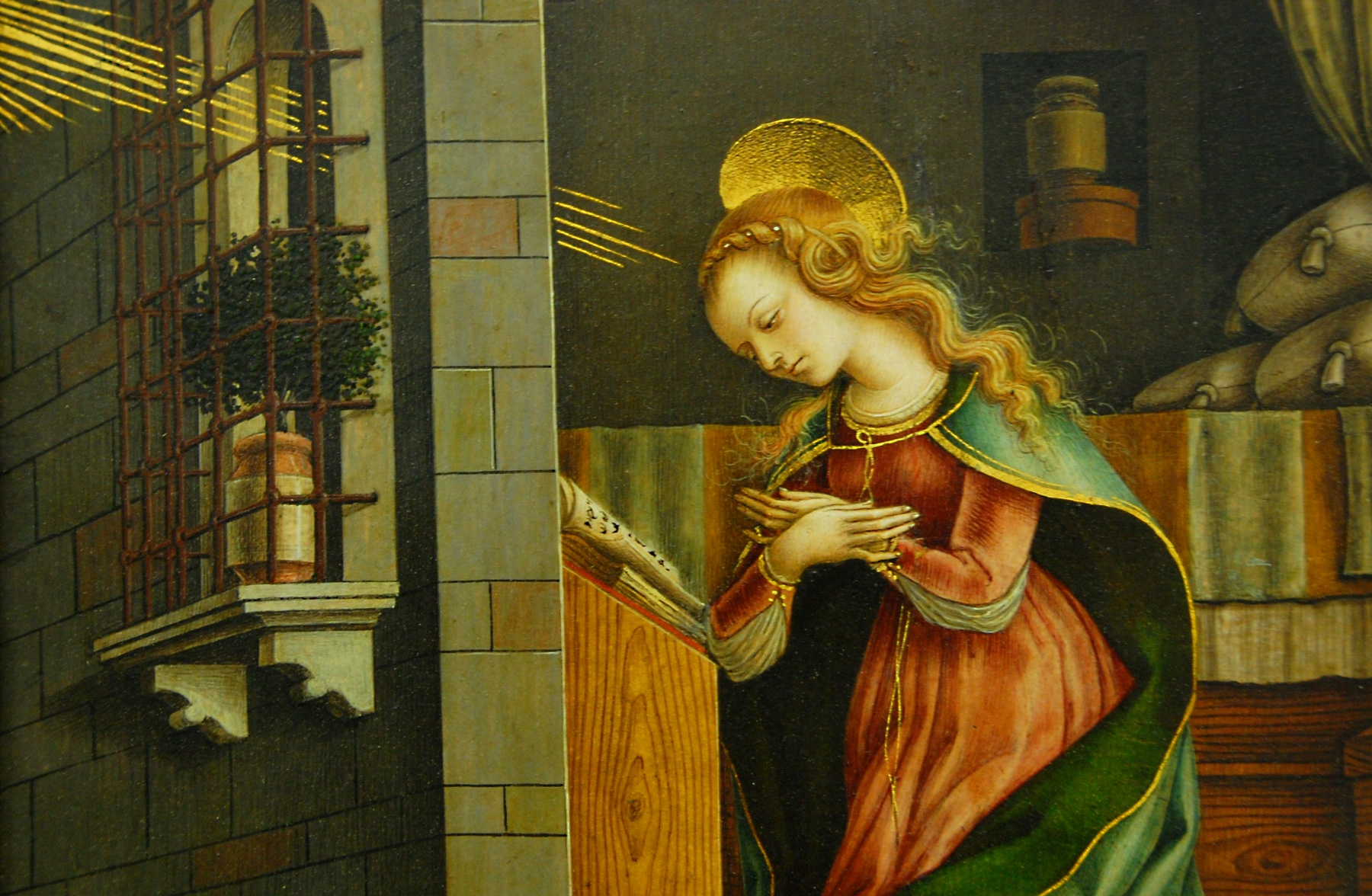
The Virgin Annunciate by Carlo Crivelli, 15th century; rays enter through the window

Annunciation by Jan van Eyck, 1434; unsurpassed painting of texture.

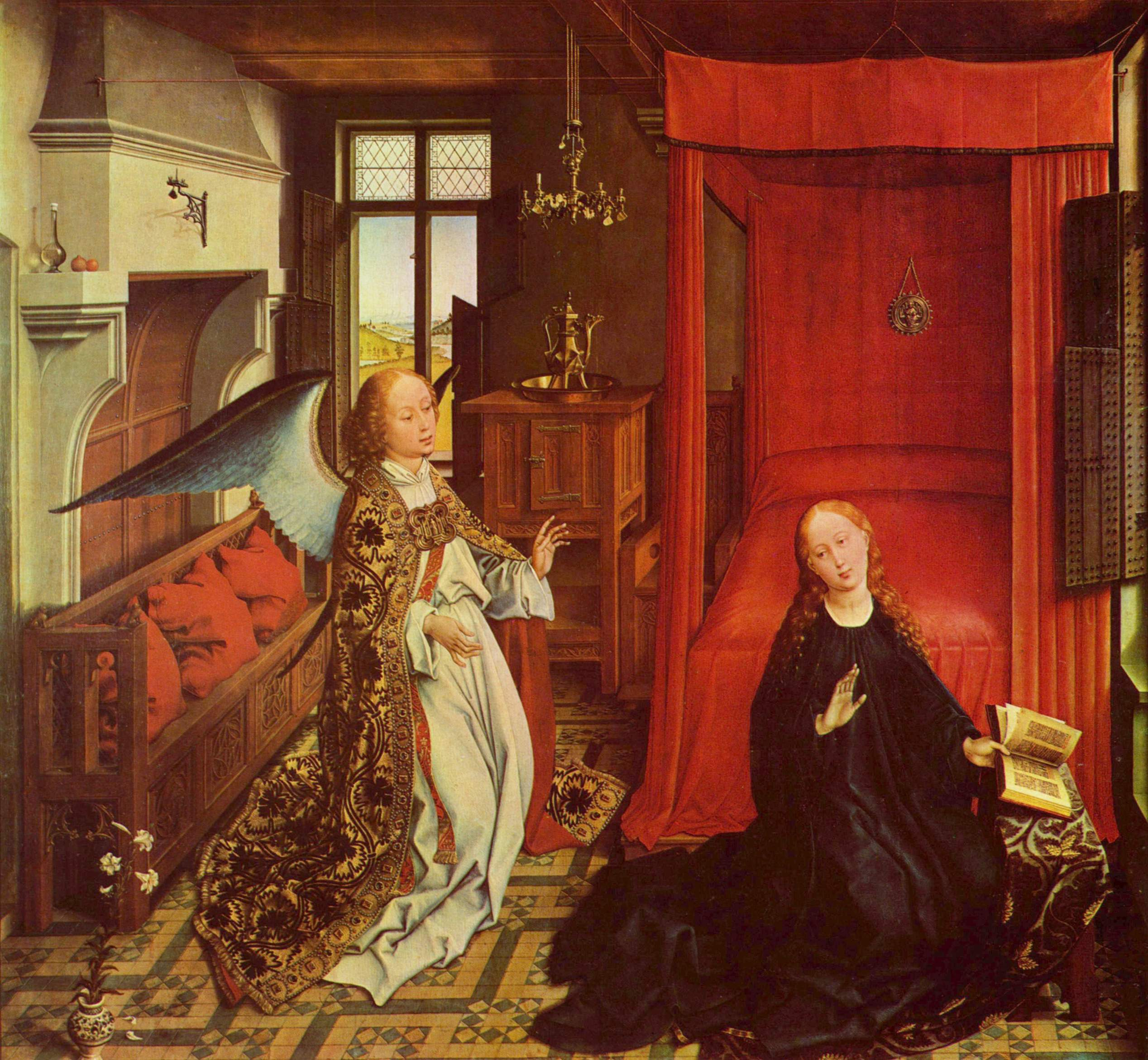
Rogier van der Weyden, 1435

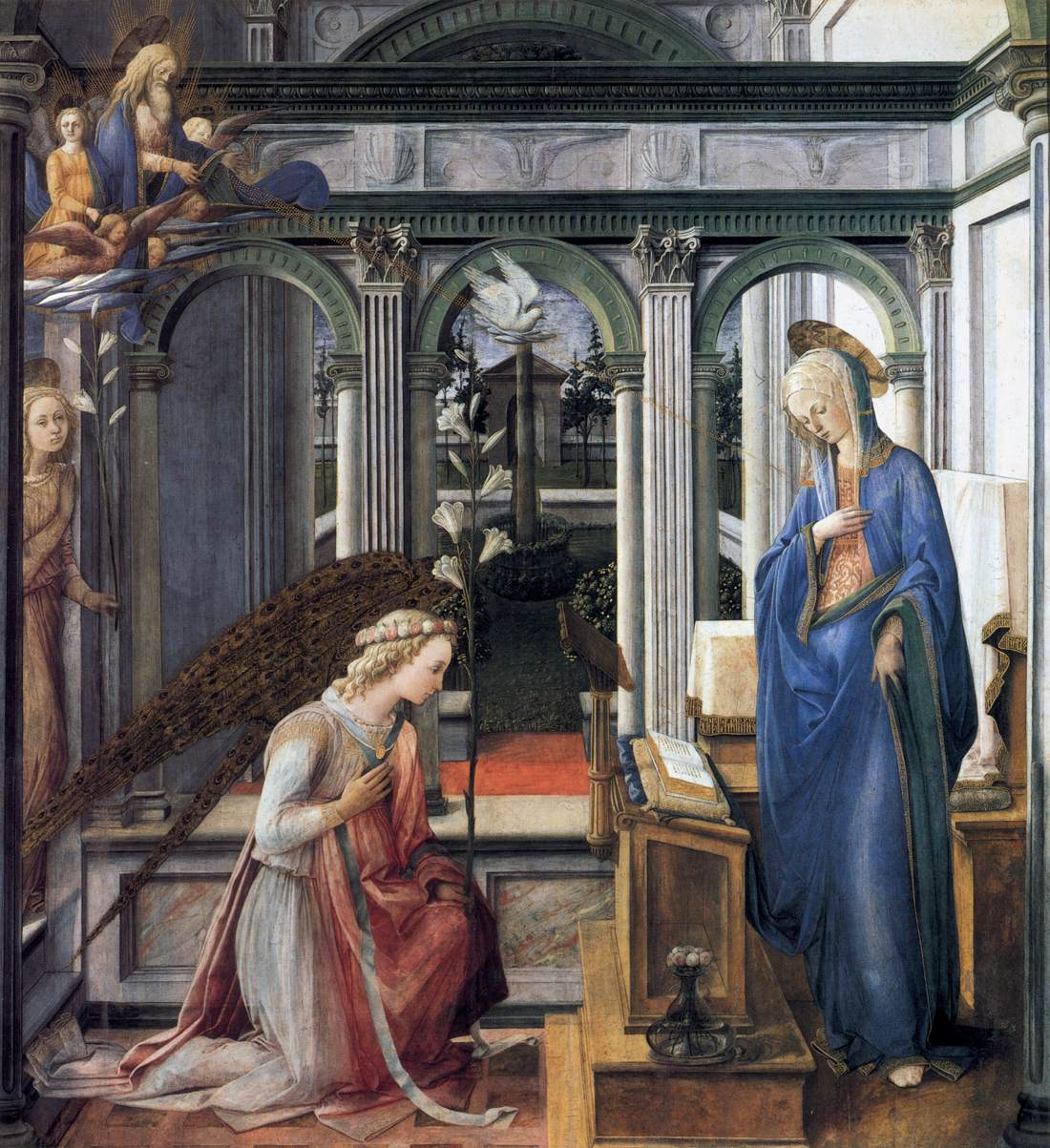
Annunciation by Filippo Lippi, 1443

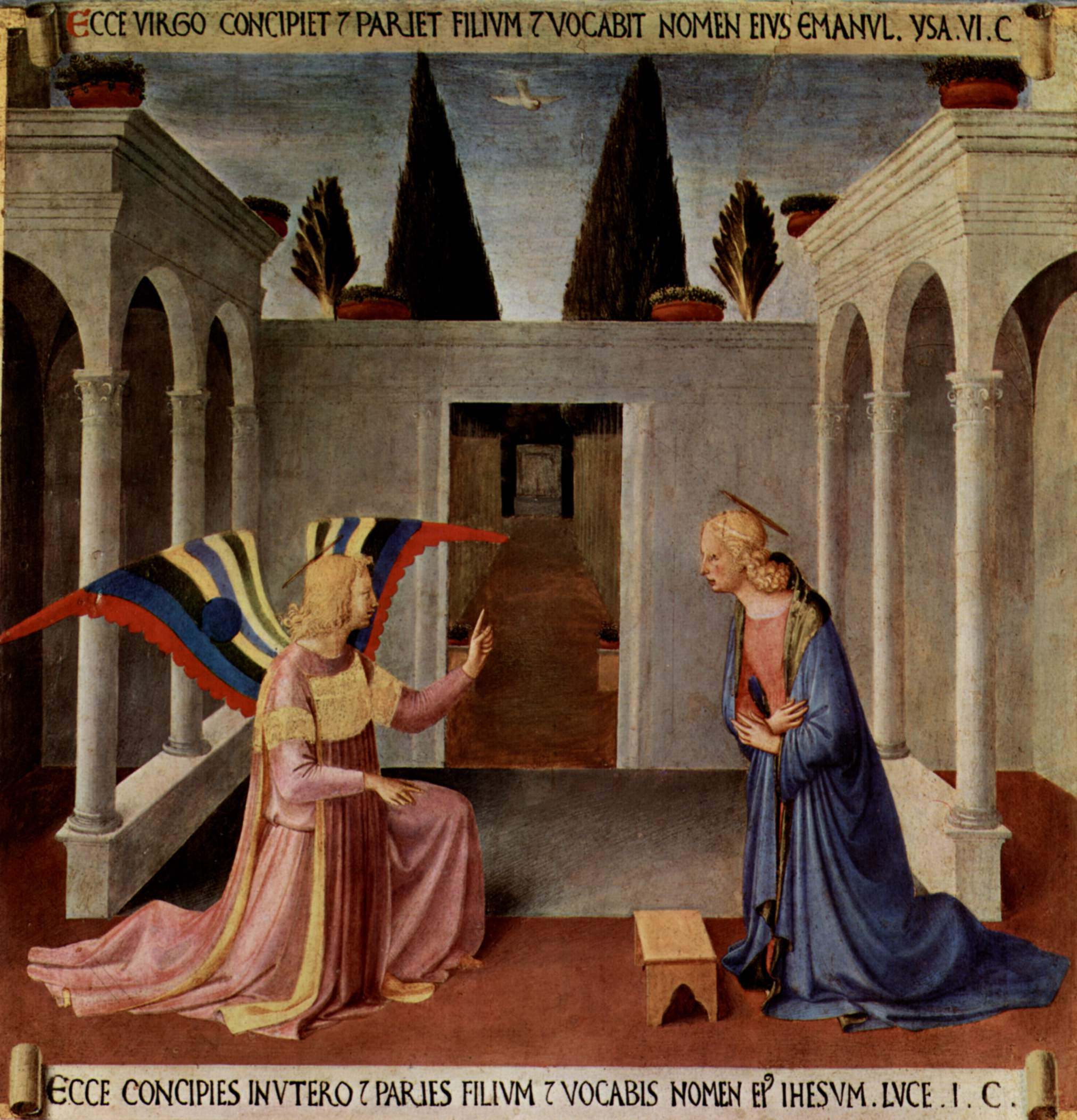
Annunciation by Fra Angelico, 1450

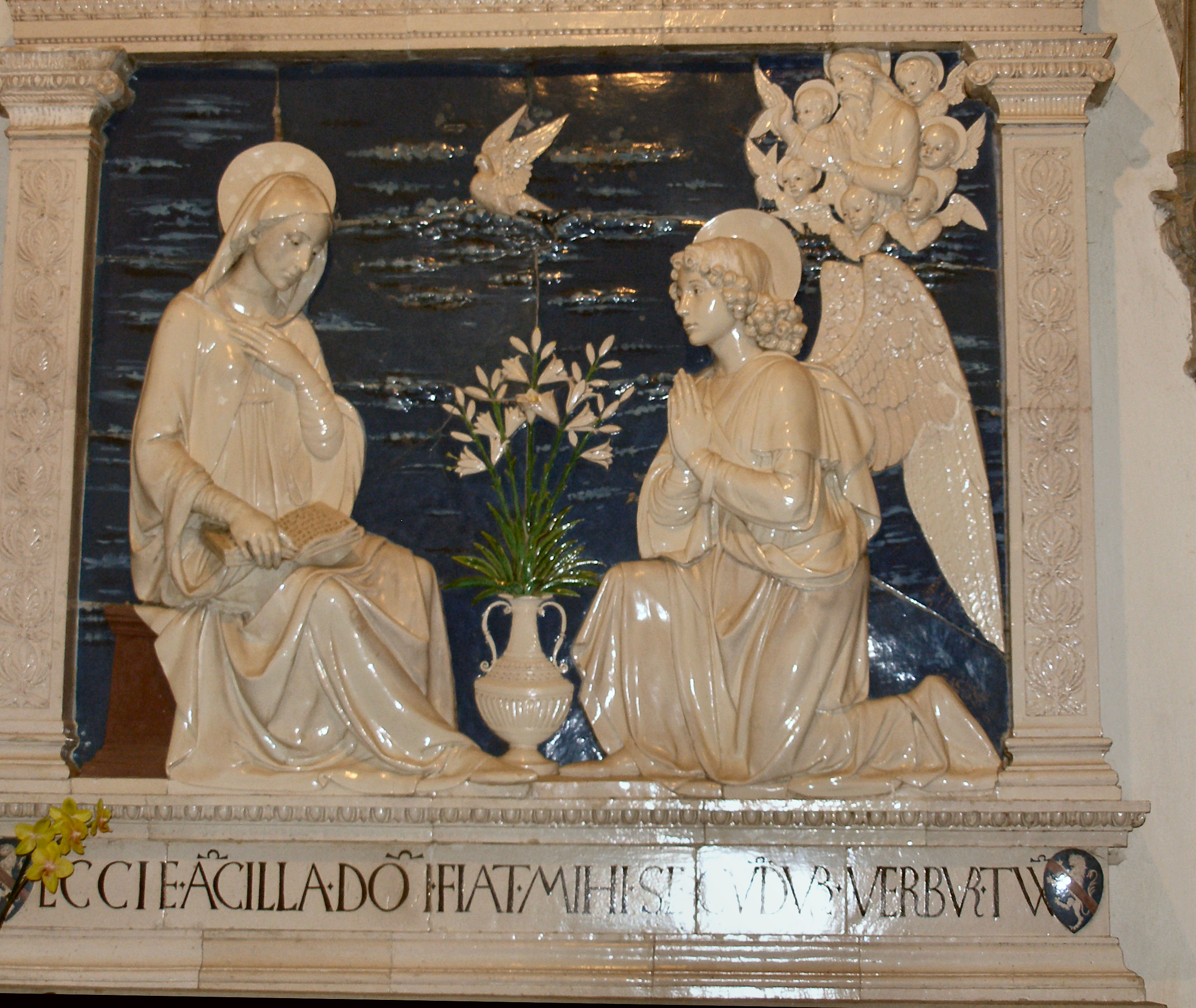
Terracotta by Andrea della Robbia

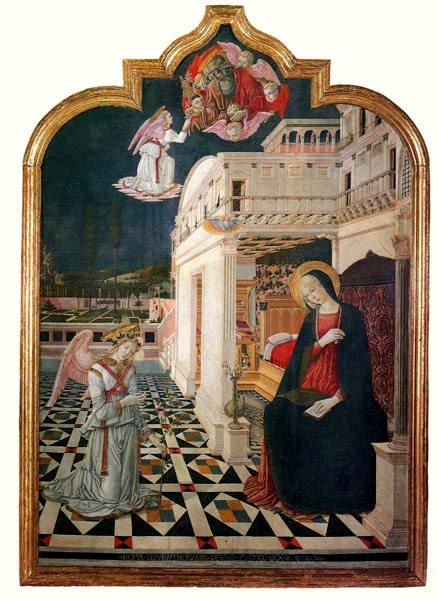
Benvenuto di Giovanni, 1470

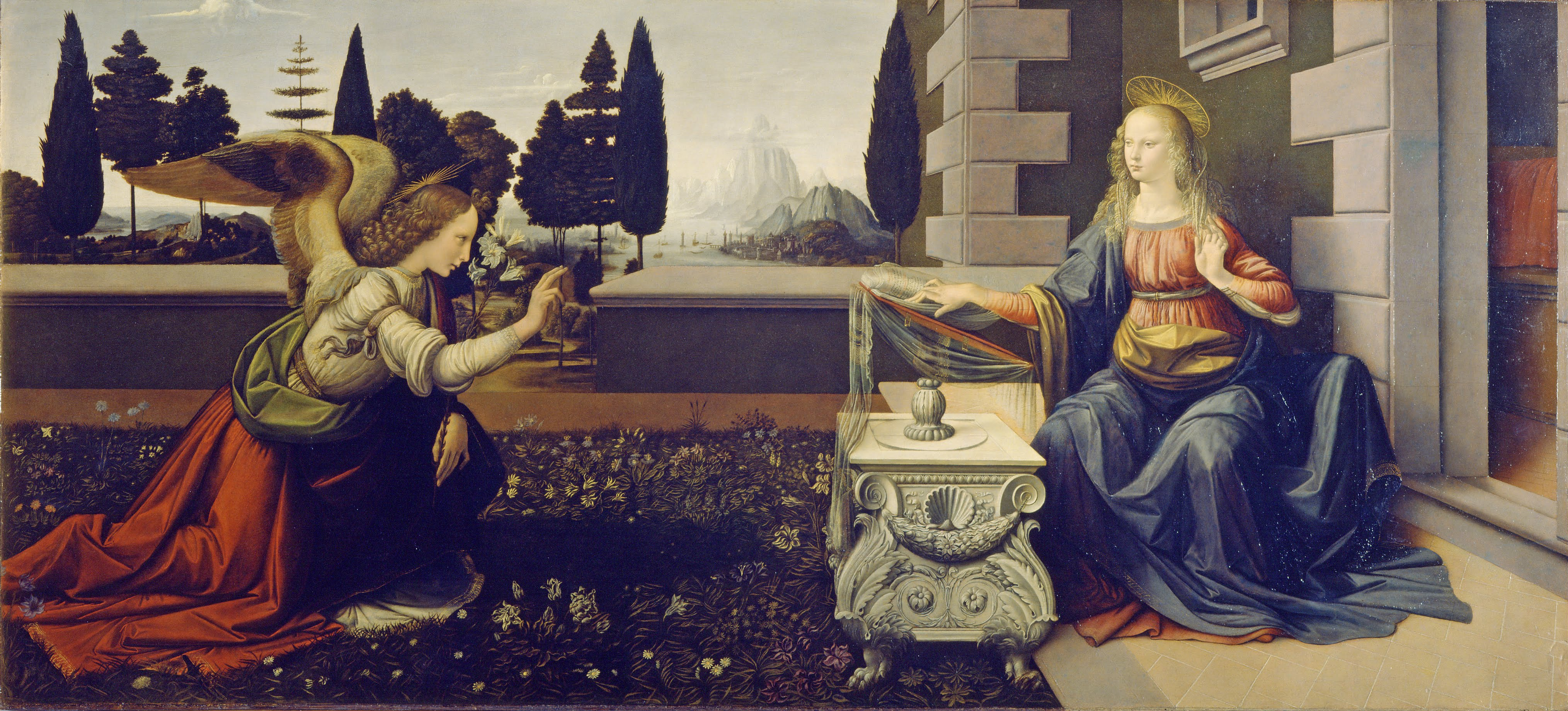
Annunciation by Leonardo da Vinci, 1472–75

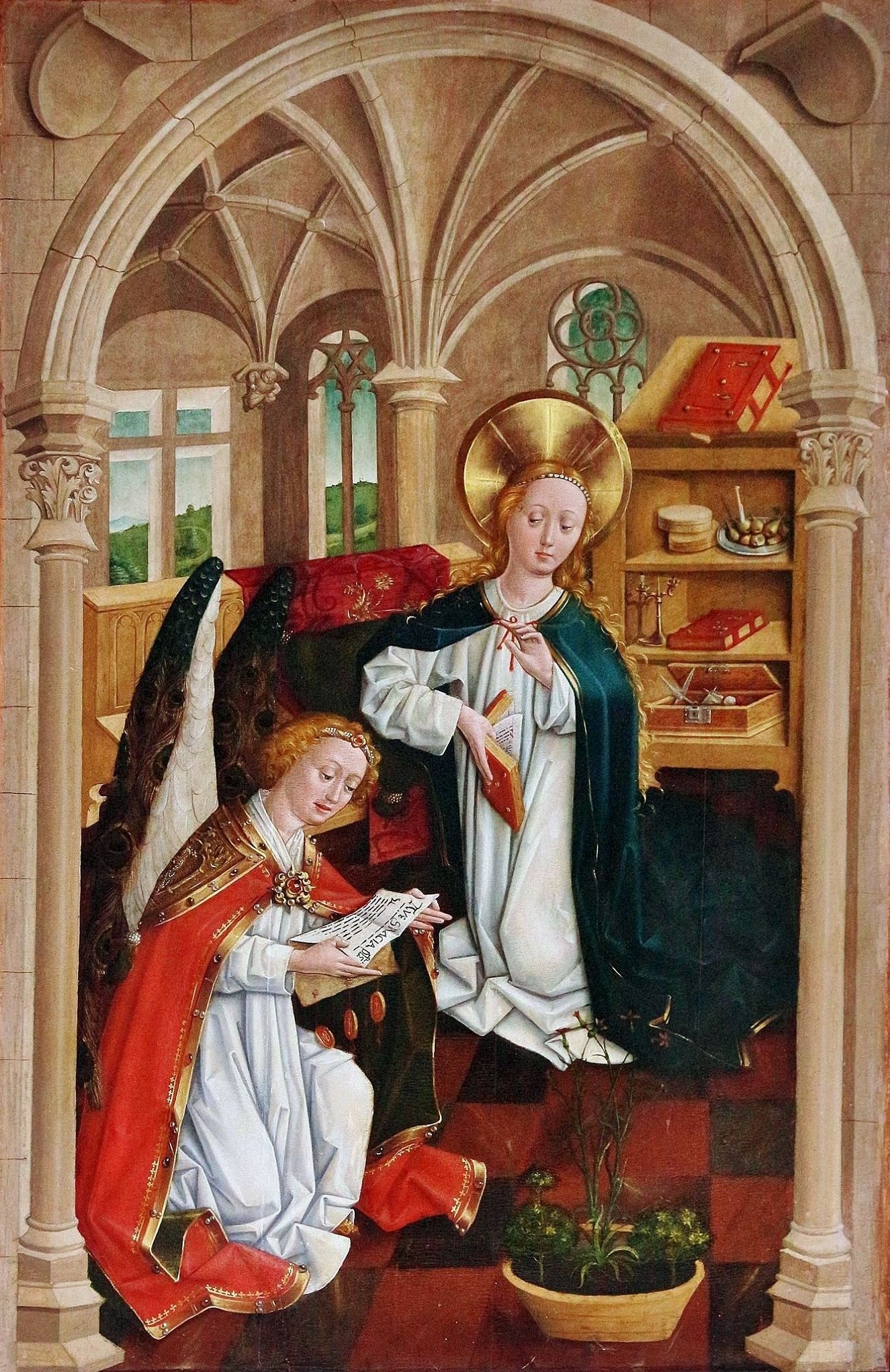
Annunciation, Our Lady of Sorrows Triptych in Holy Cross Chapel in Wawel Cathedral, Kraków, Poland, 1475–1485

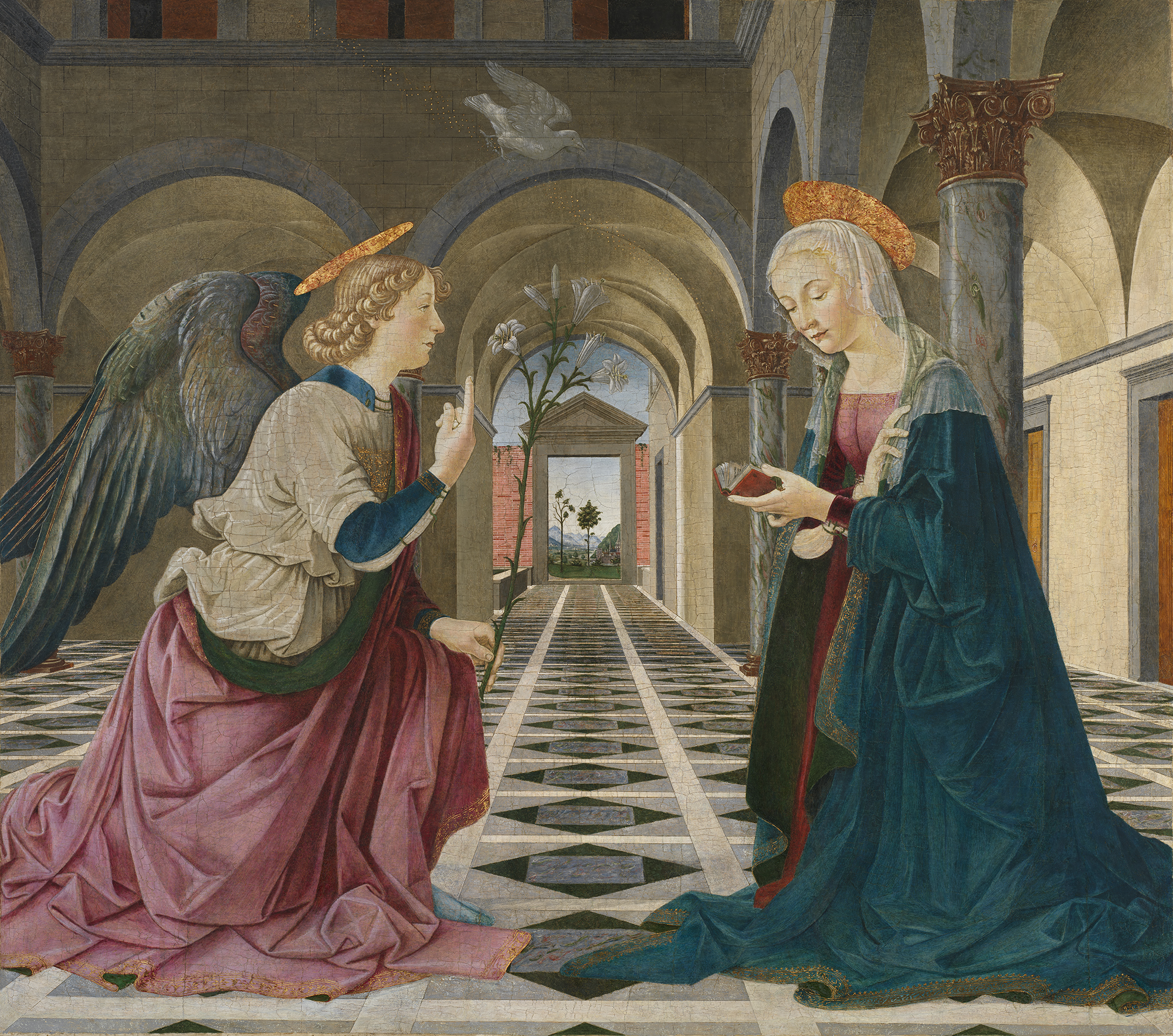
Annunciation by Piermatteo Lauro de' Manfredi da Amelia at the Isabella Stewart Gardner Museum, Boston, Massachusetts, c. 1485

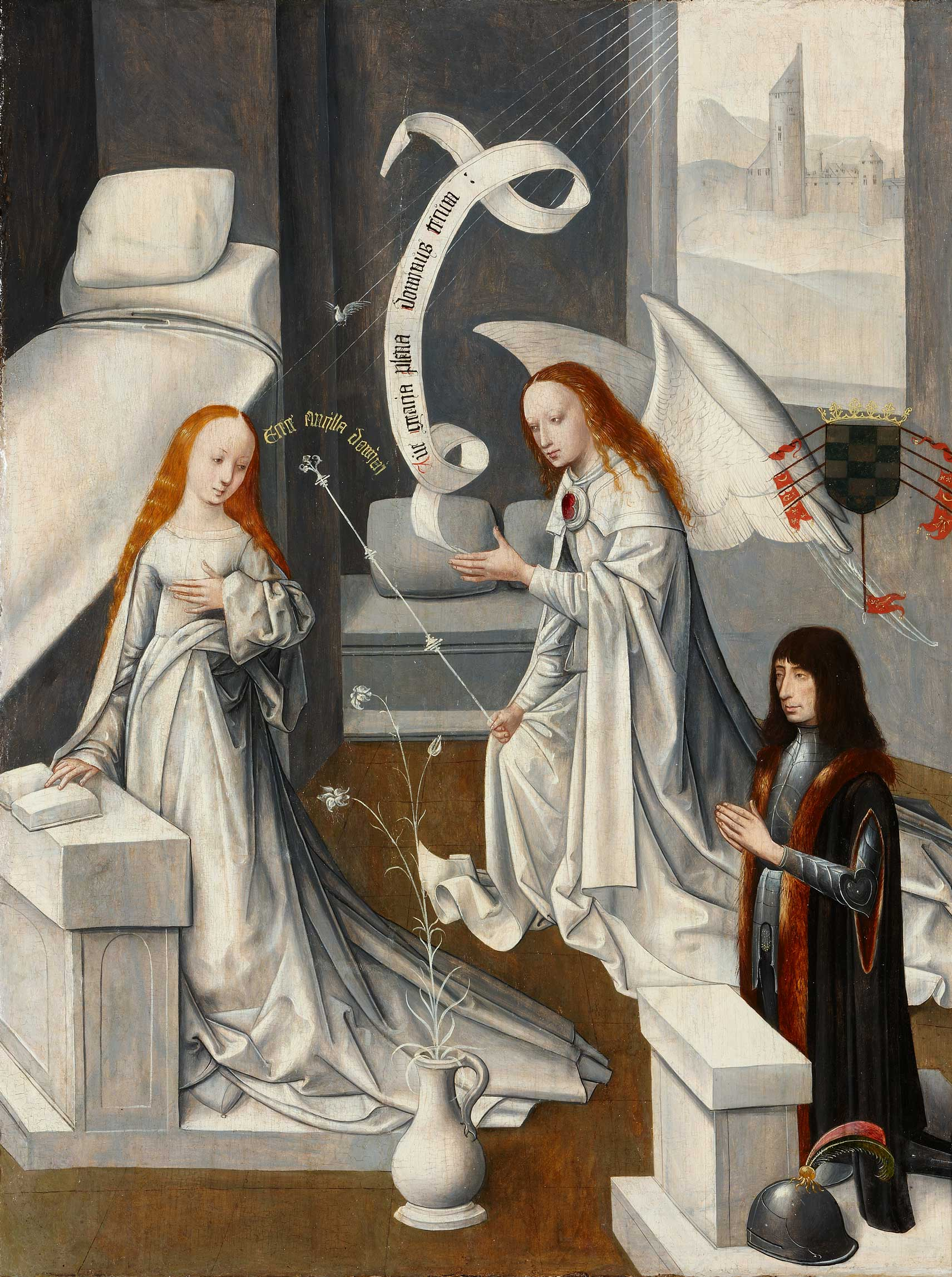
Annunciation with the 1st Duke of Alba by the Master of the Virgo inter Virgines, c. 1470-88

Annunciation of Fano by Pietro Perugino, 1489

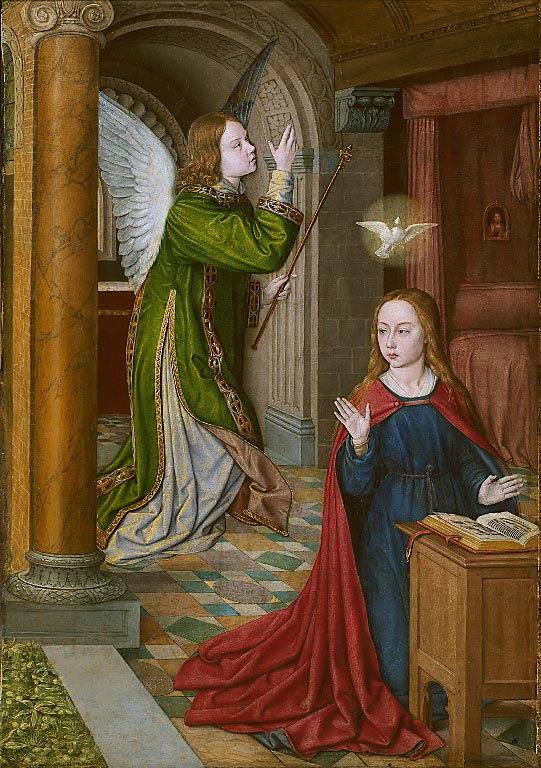
Annunciation by Jean Hey, 1490

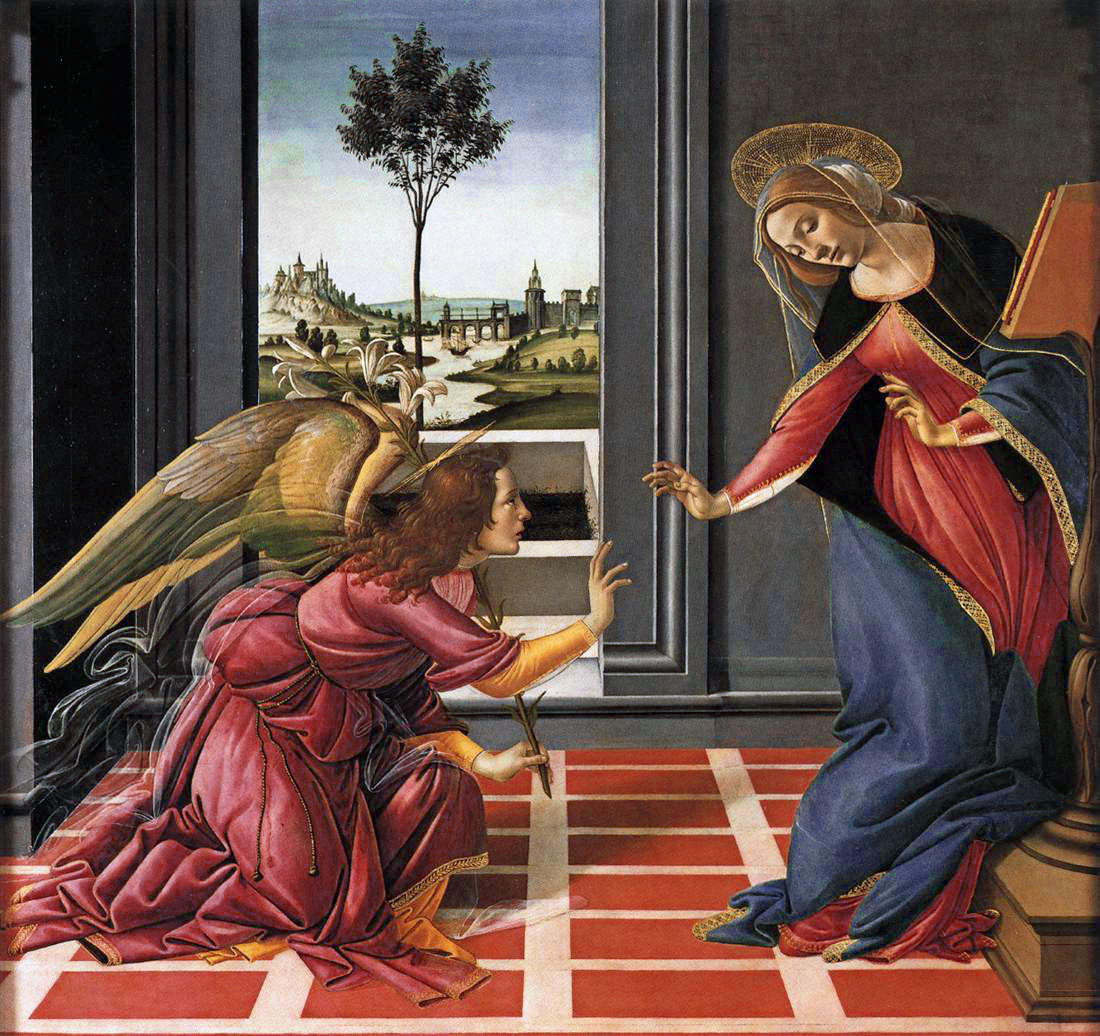
Cestello Annunciation by Botticelli, 1490

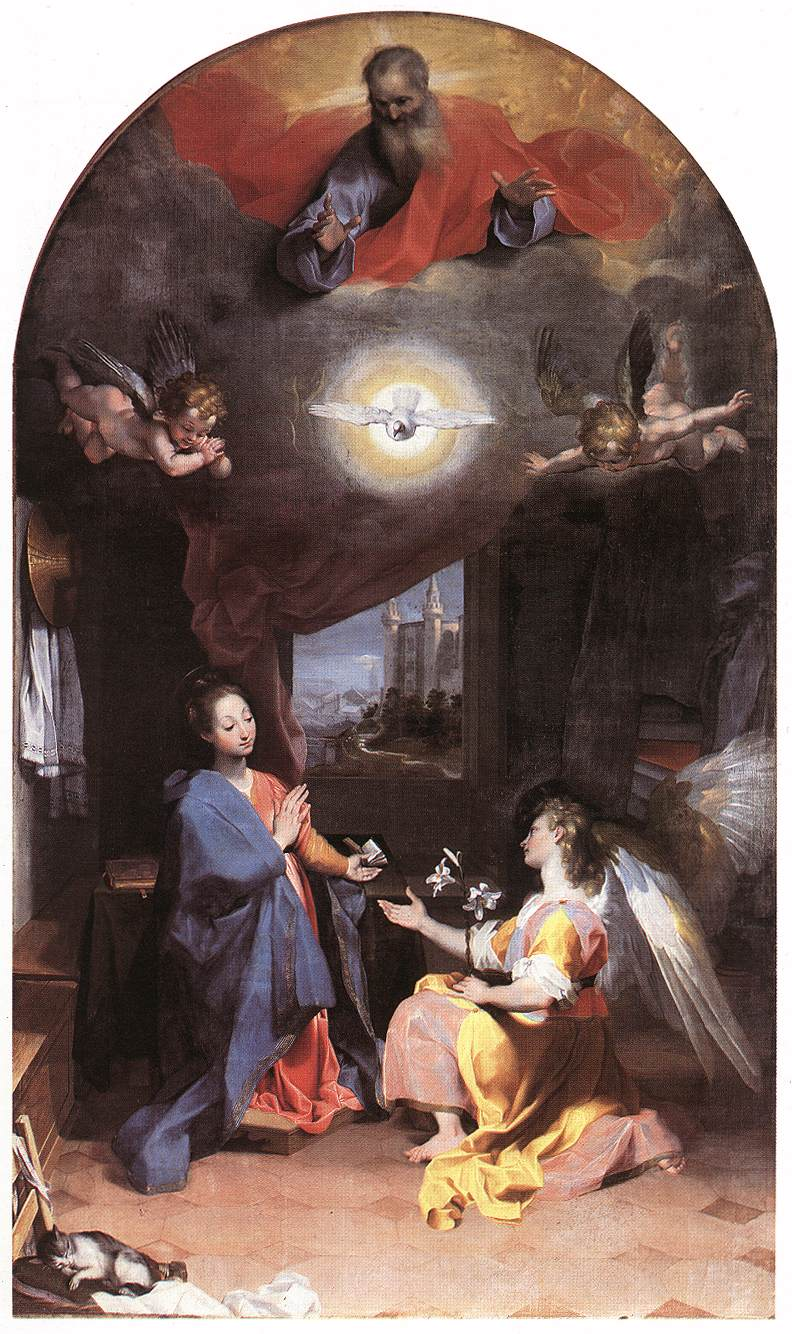
Annunciation by Federico Barocci, 16th century

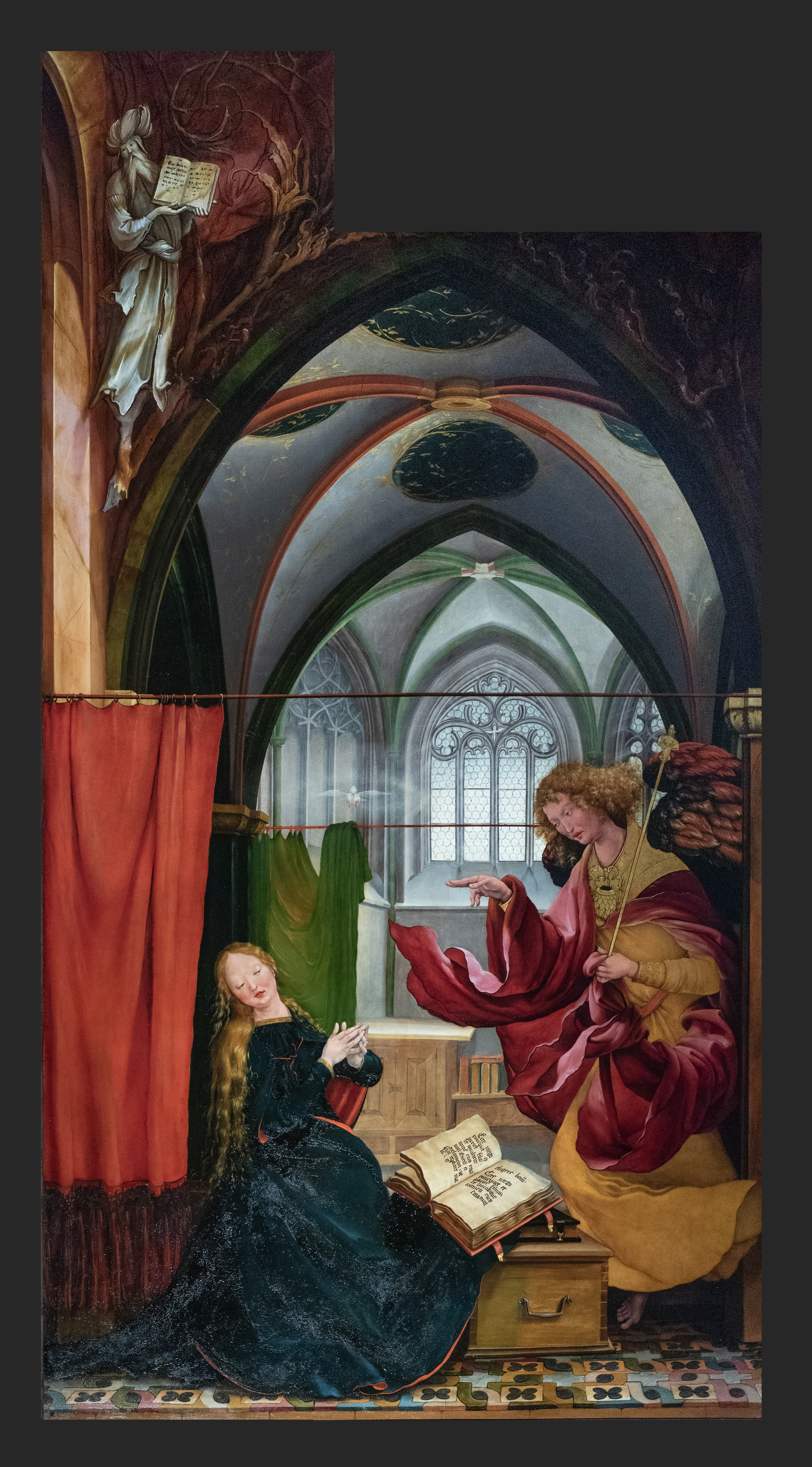
Panel from the Isenheim Altarpiece by Matthias Grünewald, 1512–1516

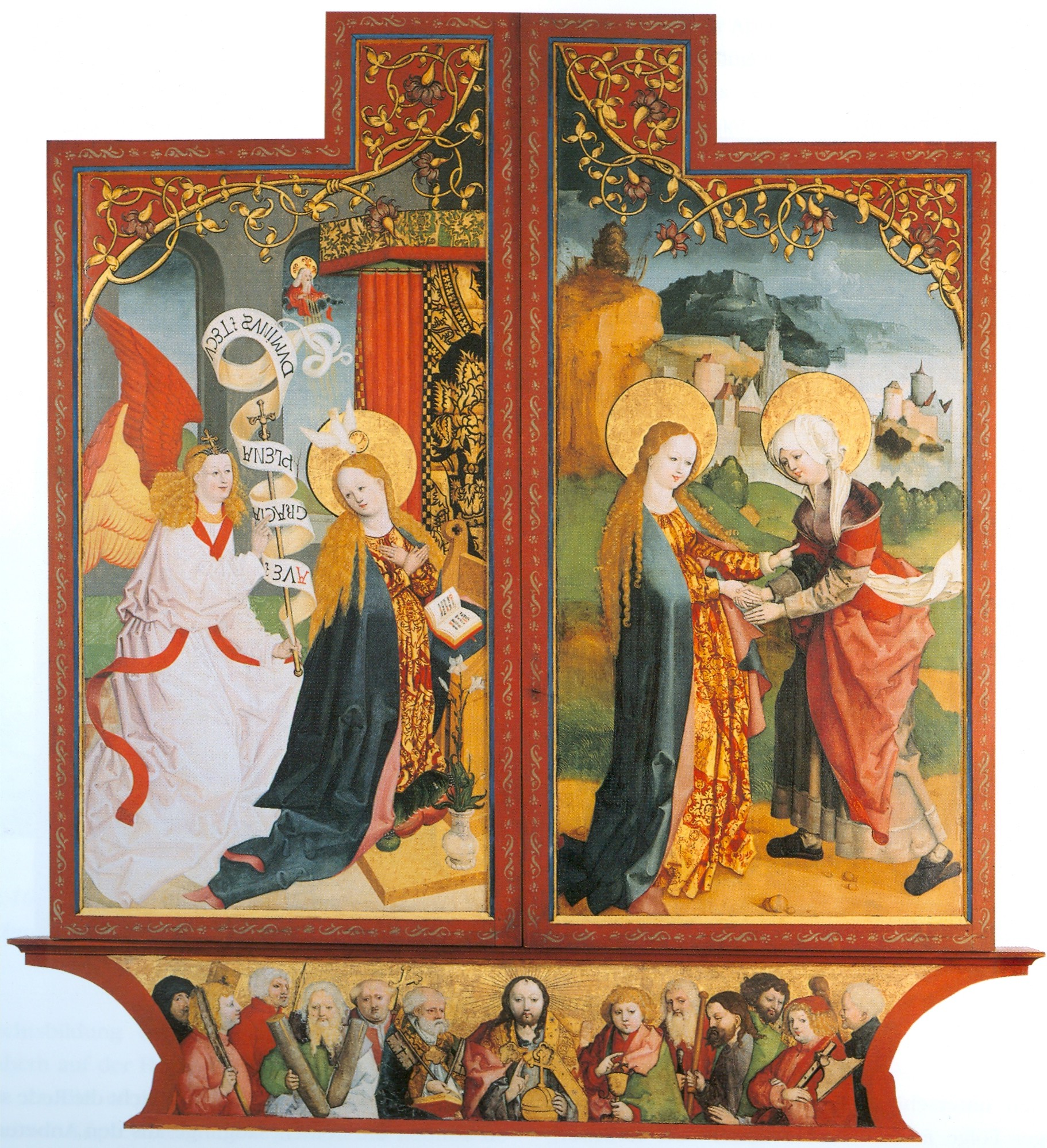
German Altarpiece, 1518

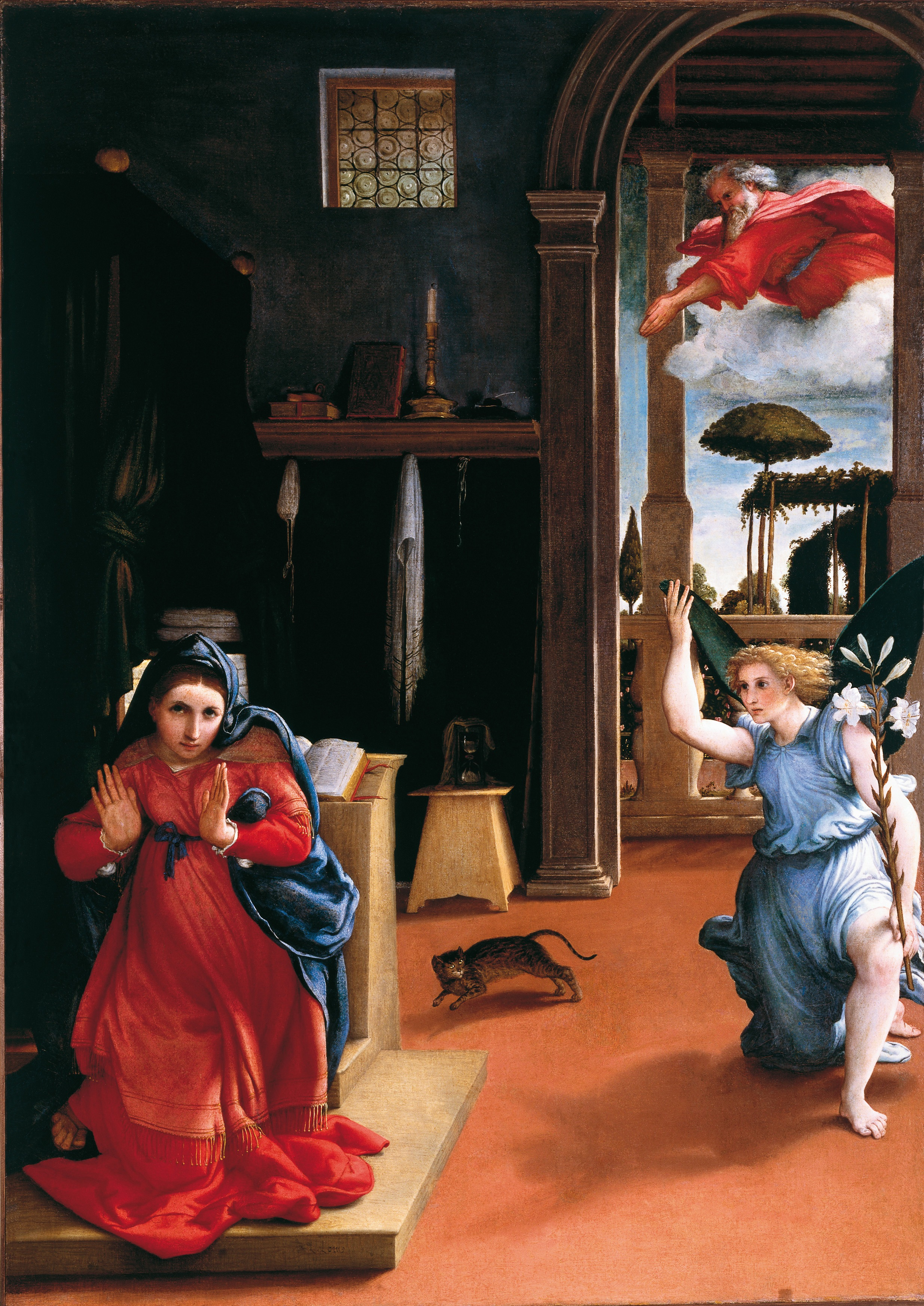
Recanati Annunciation by Lorenzo Lotto, c. 1534

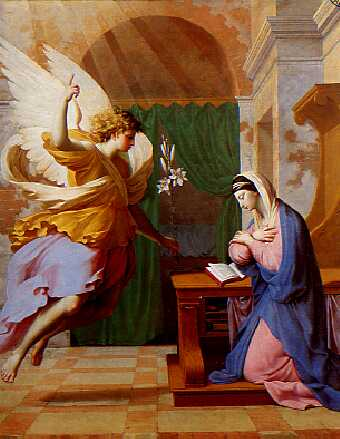
Annunciation by Eustache Le Sueur, 17th century

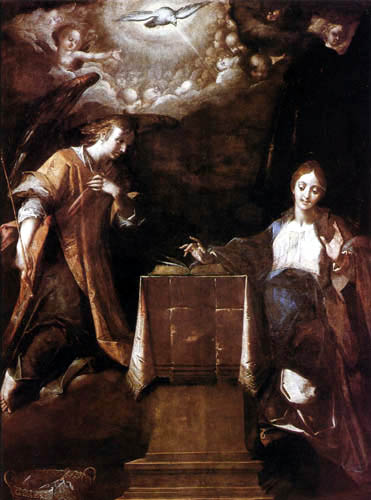
Annunciation by Hans von Aachen, 1610

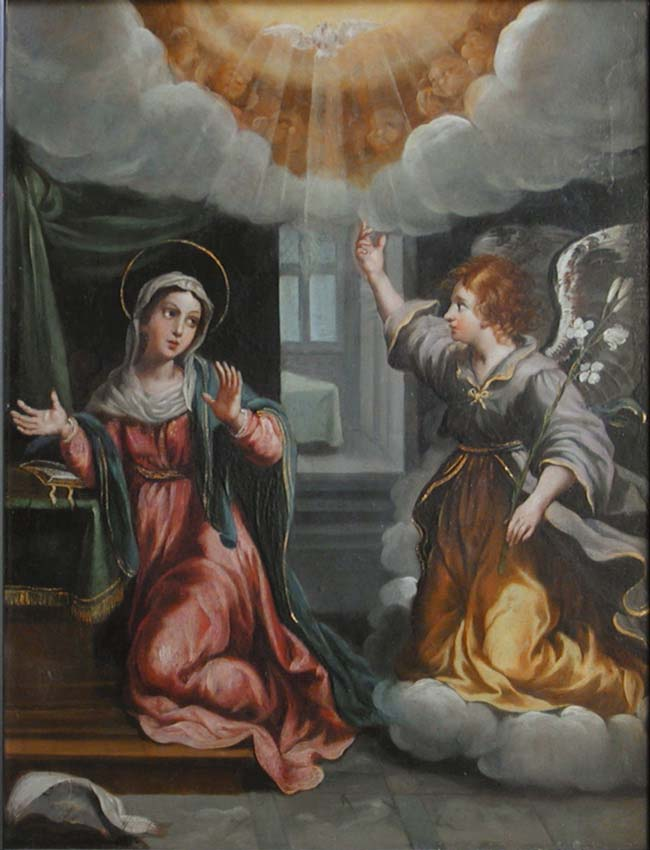
Annunciation, 1610, Mexico

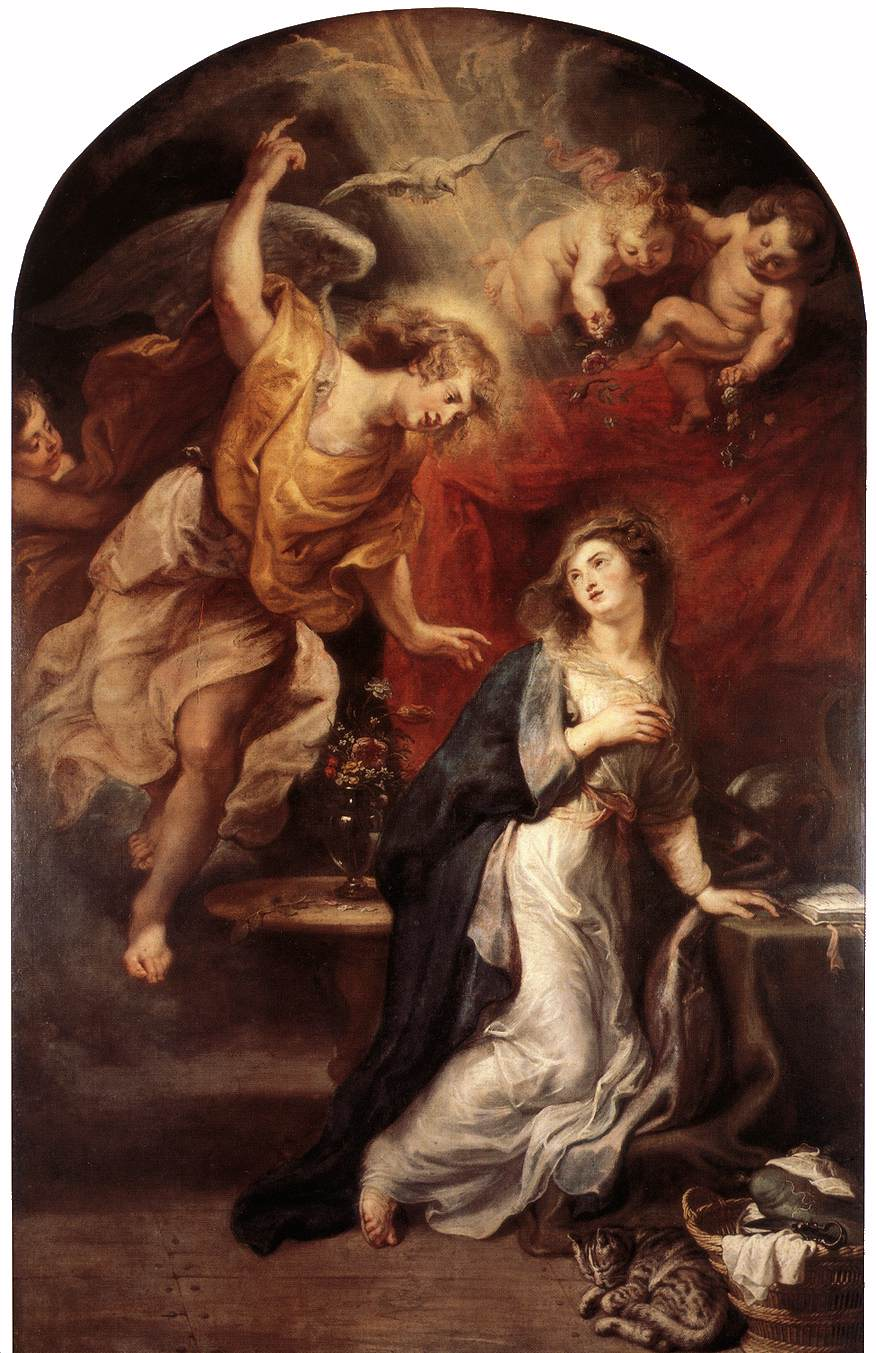
Annunciation by Rubens, 1628

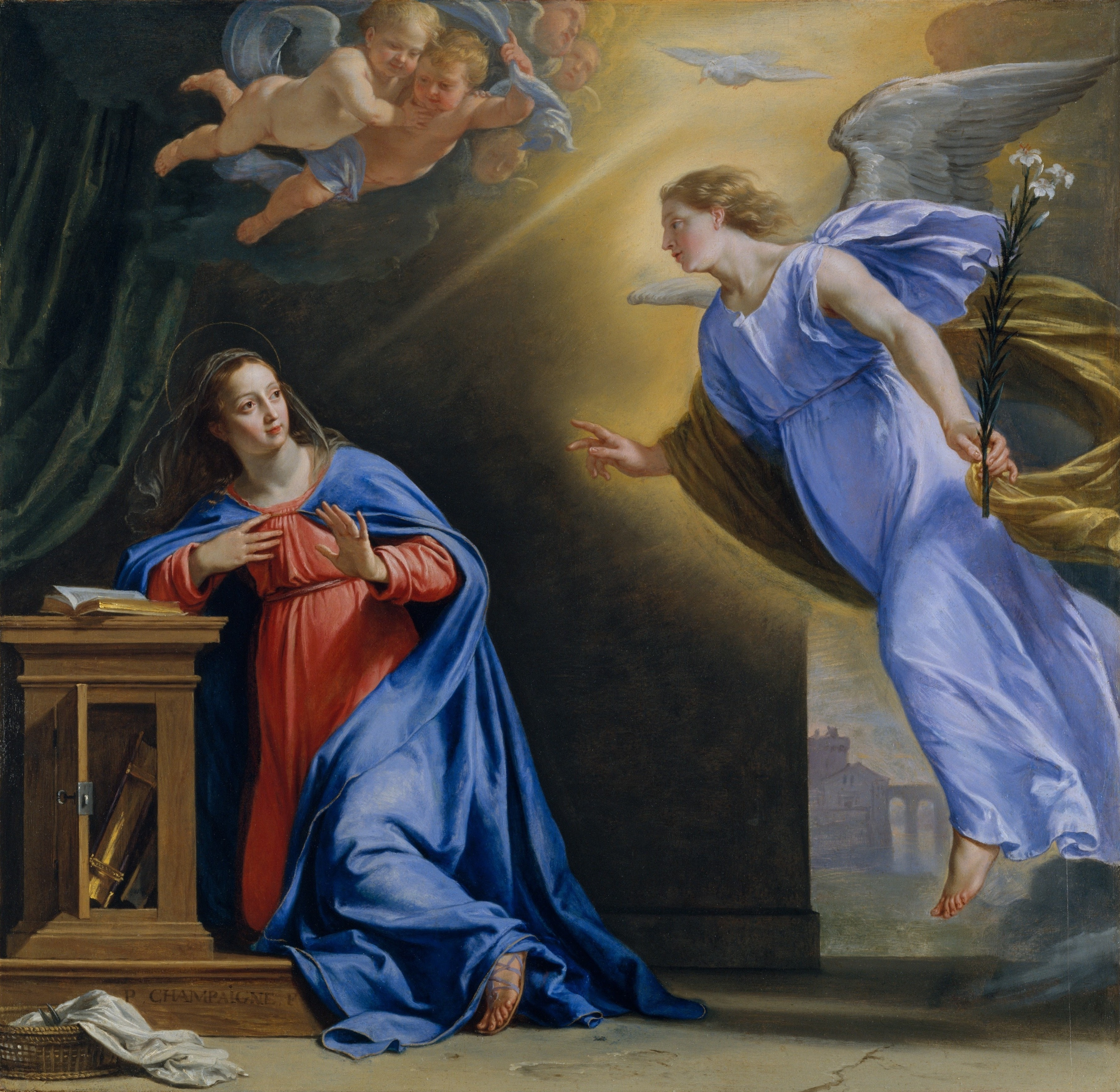
Philippe de Champaigne, 1644

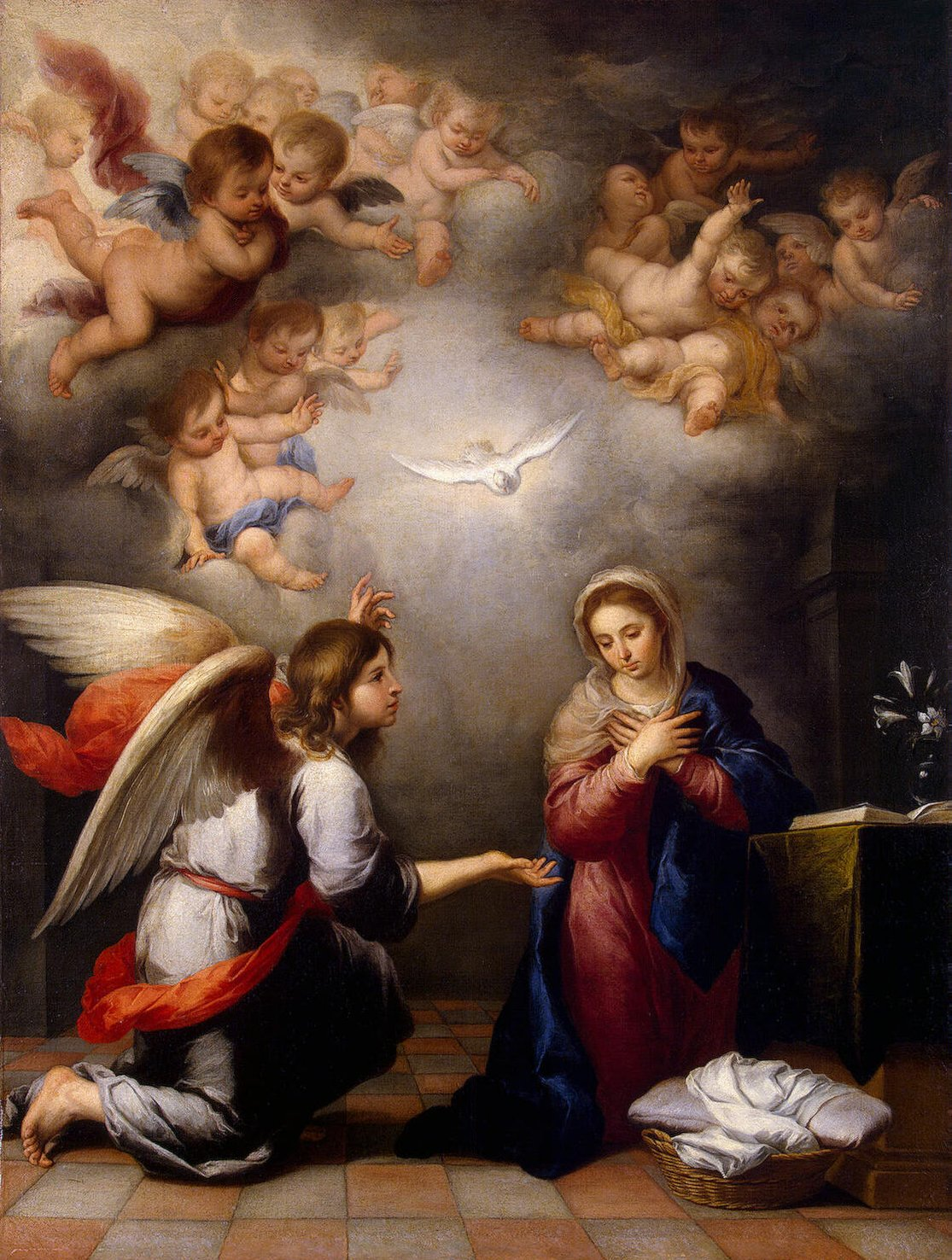
Annunciation by Murillo, 1655

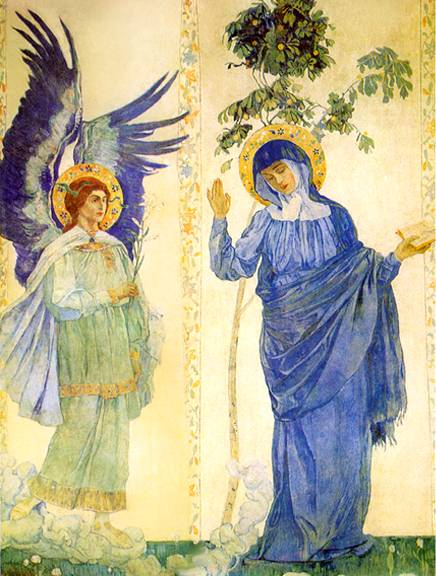
Mikhail Nesterov, 19th century

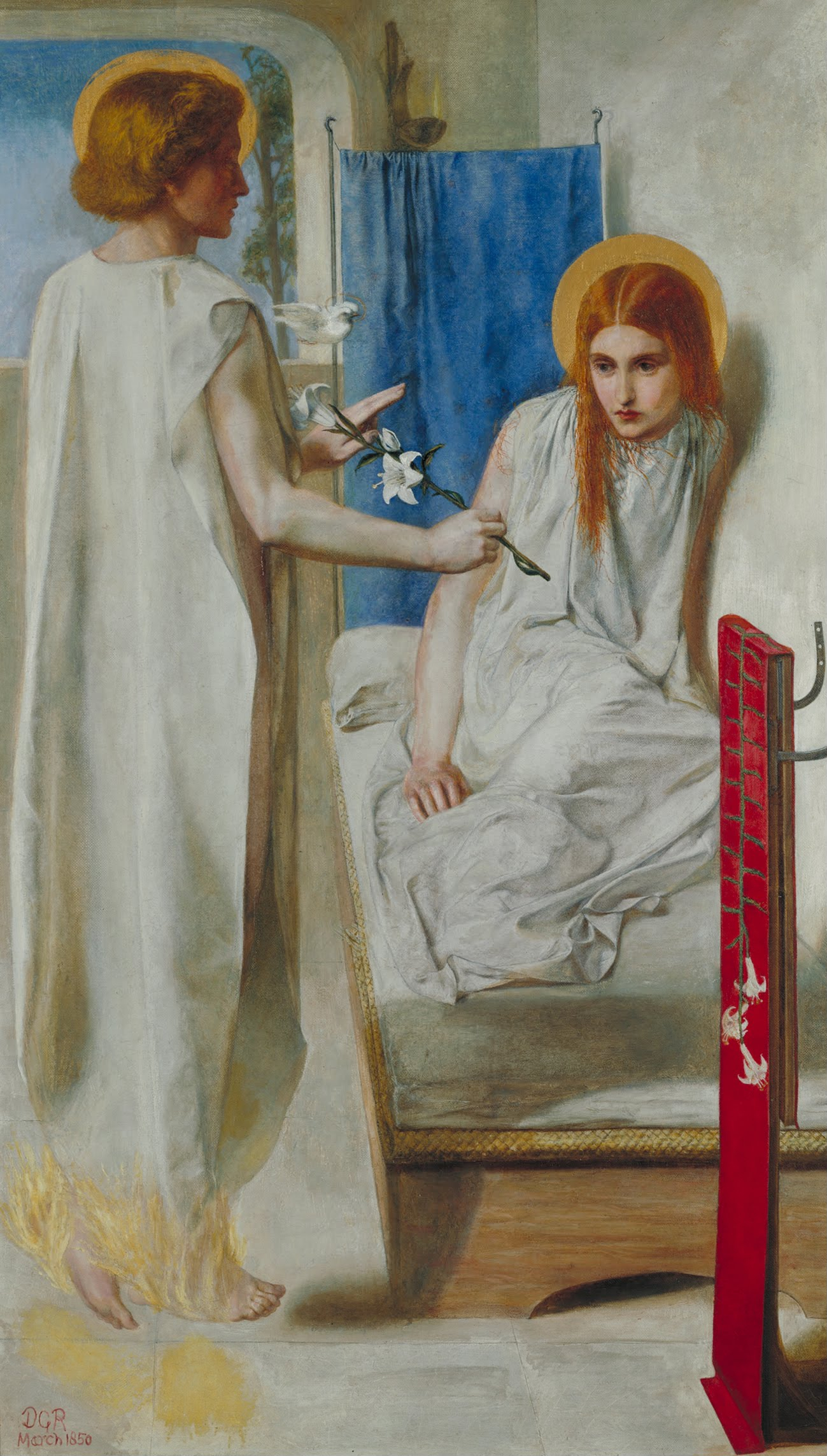
Dante Gabriel Rossetti, Ecce Ancilla Domini!, 1850

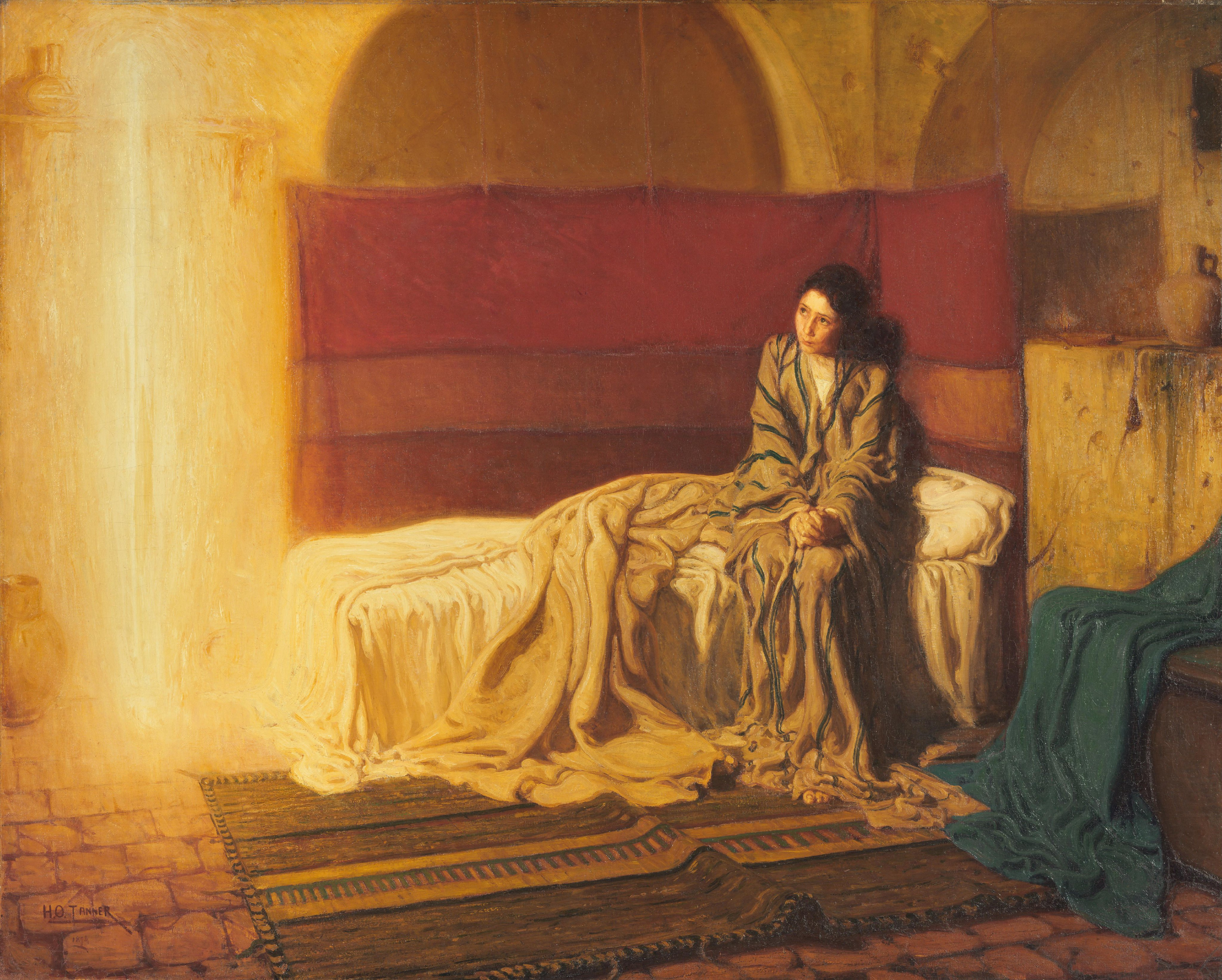
Henry Ossawa Tanner, The Annunciation, 1898

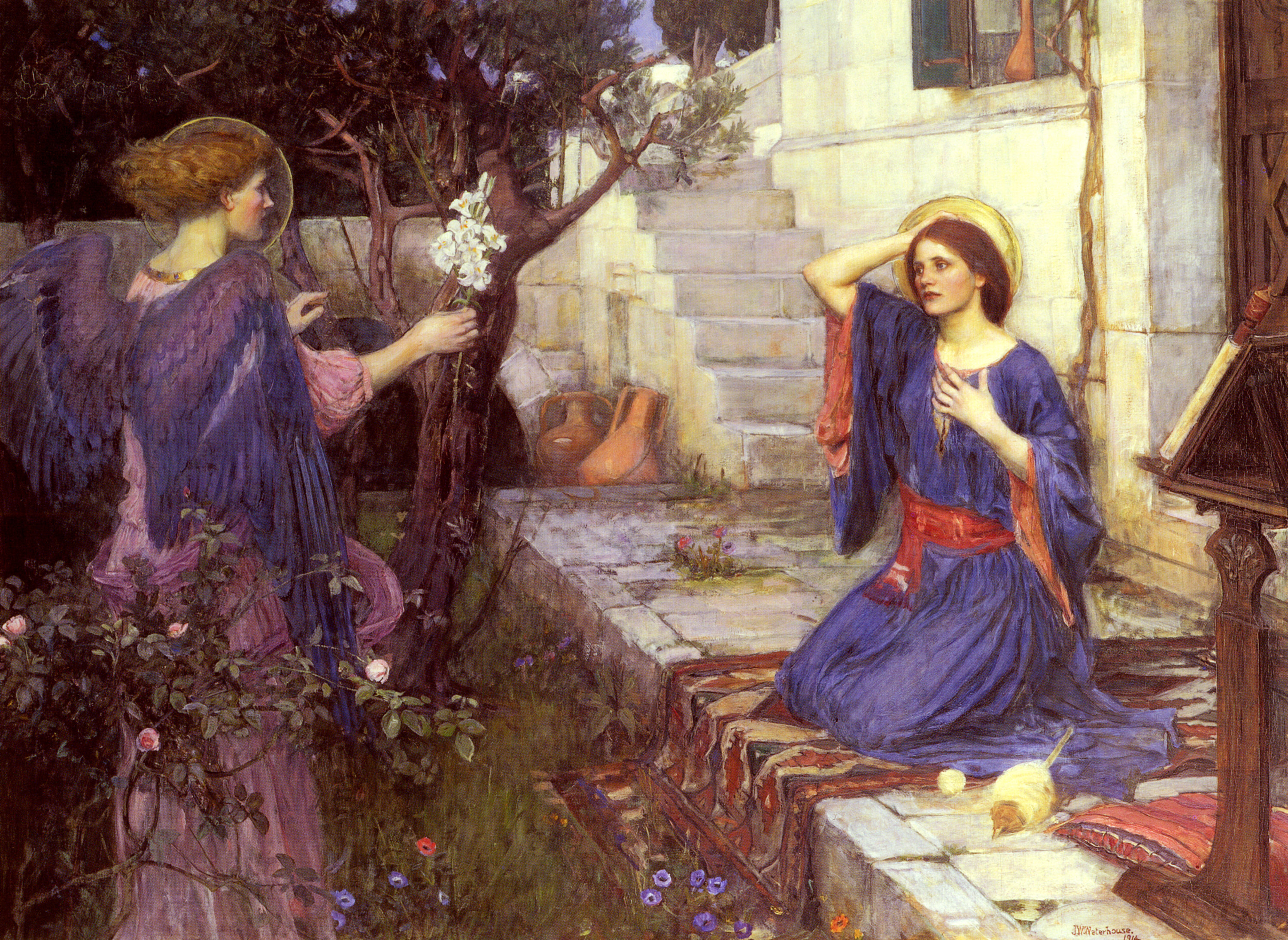
Annunciation by John William Waterhouse, 1914

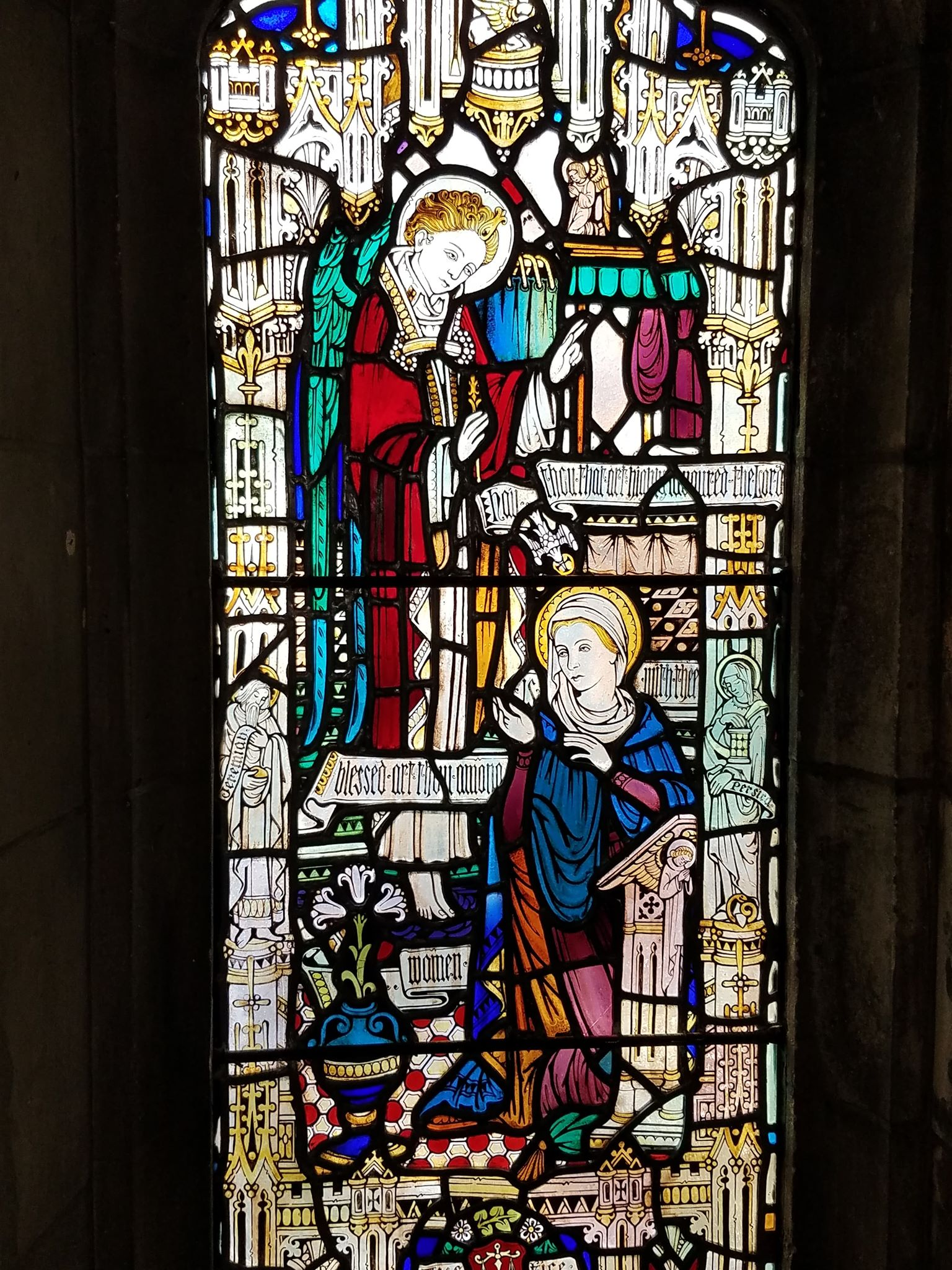
Annunciation window at Church of the Good Shepherd (Rosemont, Pennsylvania), c. 1910

== See also ==
- Roman Catholic Marian art
