= Annunciation (Botticelli, Glasgow) =

Painting by Sandro Botticelli and his studio

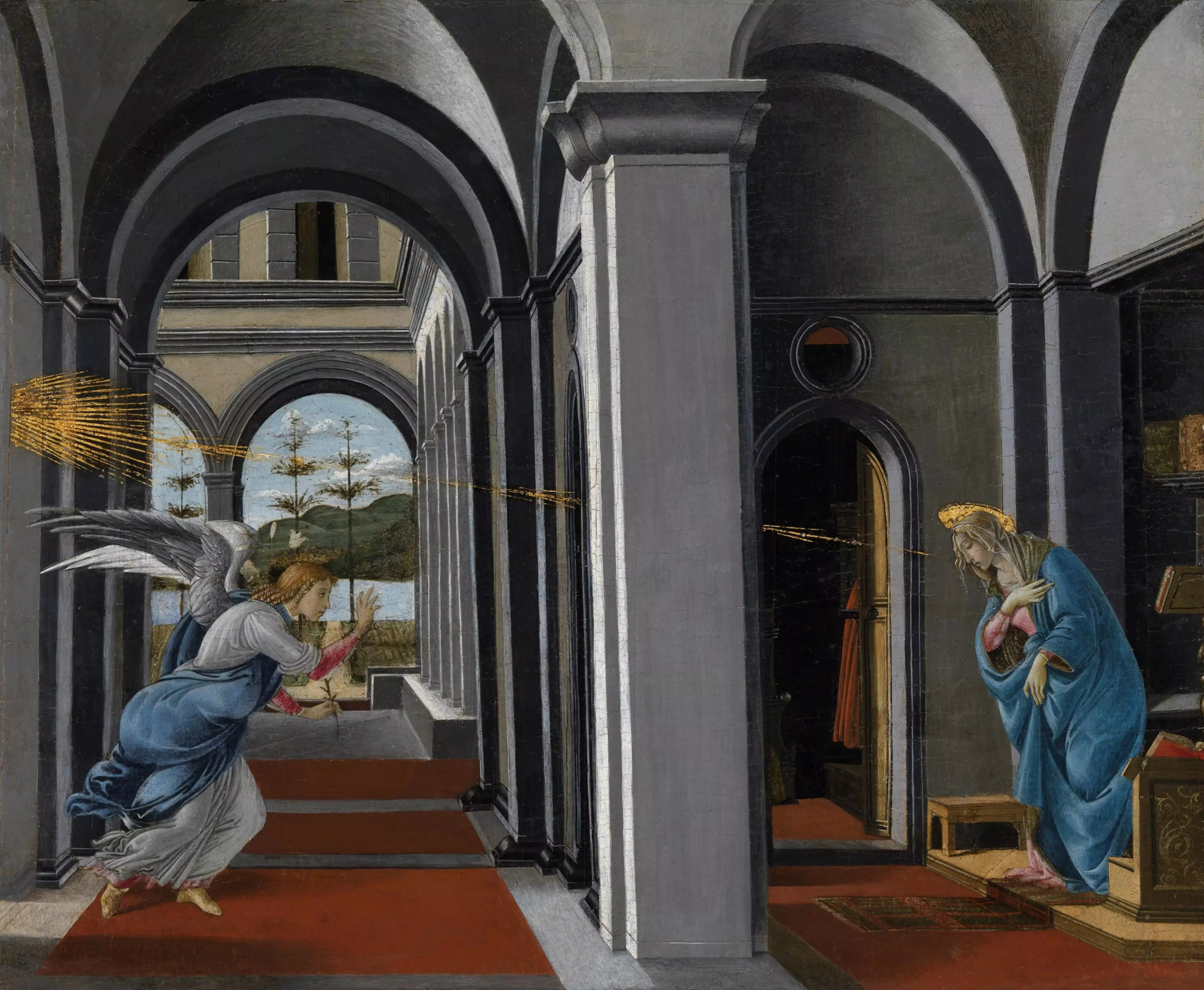
- Artist: Sandro Botticelli
- Year: circa 1490
- Medium: tempera on panel
- Dimensions: 49.5 cm × 58.5 cm (19.5 in × 23.0 in)
- Location: Kelvingrove Art Gallery and Museum, Glasgow

The Annunciation is a tempera on panel painting in the Kelvingrove Art Gallery and Museum in Glasgow, Scotland made by the Italian Renaissance master Sandro Botticelli and his studio. The painting, which is 49.5 cm tall and 58.5 cm wide, depicts the angel Gabriel announcing news of the conception and future birth of Jesus to Mary. An inscription on the reverse side notes that the painting once was in the Church of Saint Barnaba in Florence.

Scholars have noted similarities in Botticelli's composition to the architectural forms of Guiliano da Sangallo. The painting is often dated circa 1490, a time when Botticelli painted a similar version of the Annunciation, now in the Metropolitan Museum of Art, New York.

== See also ==
- List of works by Sandro Botticelli
