= Chaperon (headgear) =

Type of head cover

Probable self-portrait by Jan van Eyck, 1433, National Gallery. The chaperon is worn in style A with just a patch of the bourrelet showing (right of centre) through the cornette wound round it (practical for painting in).

A chaperon (/ˈʃæpəroʊn/ or /ˈʃæpərɒn/; Middle French: chaperon) was a form of hood or, later, a highly versatile hat worn by men in all parts of Western Europe in the Middle Ages. Initially a utilitarian garment, it first grew a long partly decorative tail behind (a liripipe), and then developed into a complex, versatile and expensive item of headgear after what was originally the vertical opening for the face began to be used as a horizontal opening for the head. The chaperon was especially fashionable in mid-15th century Burgundy, before gradually falling out of fashion in the late-15th century and returning to its utilitarian status. It is the most commonly worn male headgear in Early Netherlandish painting, but its complicated construction is often misunderstood.

== Humble origins ==
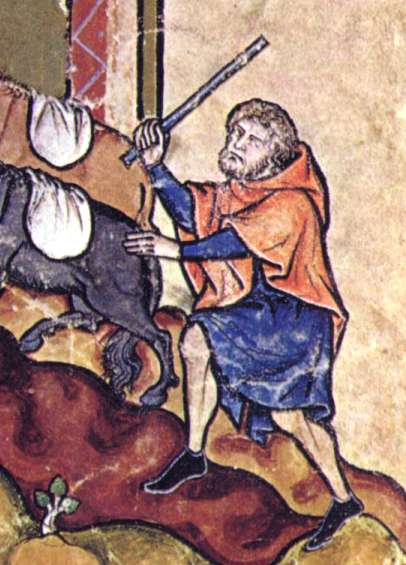
The original form of chaperon, worn with the hood pulled back off the head. Many were shorter than this example. Morgan Bible, mid 13th century.

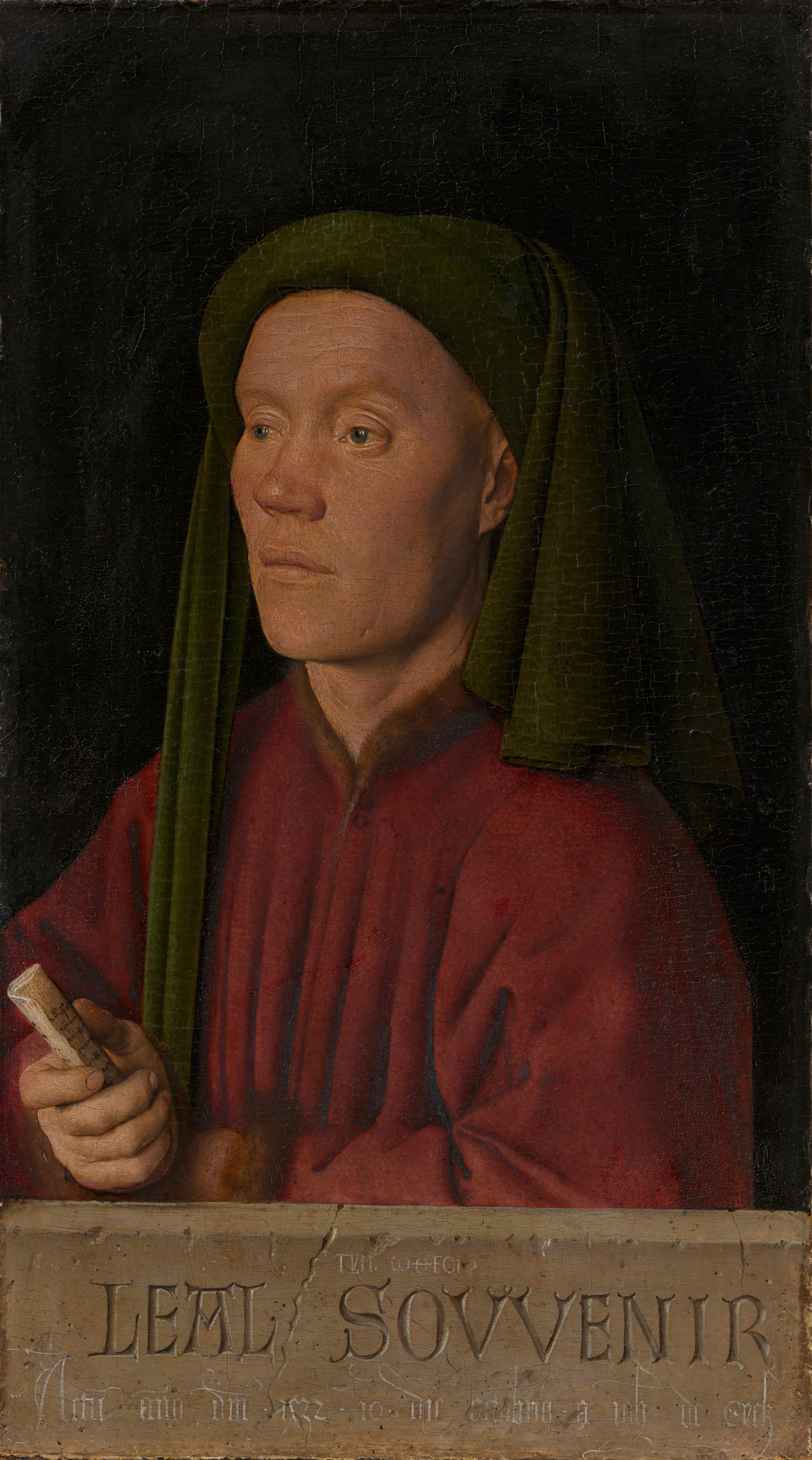
Léal Souvenir by Jan van Eyck, 1432, National Gallery. A relatively simple wool chaperon, with bourrelet, and cornette hanging forward.

The chaperon began before 1200 as a hood with a short cape, put on by pulling over the head, or fastening at the front. The hood could be pulled off the head to hang behind, leaving the short cape round the neck and shoulders. The edge of the cape was often trimmed, cut or scalloped for decorative effect. There were woolen ones, used in cold weather, and lighter ones for summer. In this form it continued through to the end of the Middle Ages, worn by the lower classes, often by women as well as men, and especially in Northern Europe. The hood was loose at the back, and sometimes ended in a tail that came to a point.

== Terms and derivation ==
Chaperon is a diminutive of chape, which derives, like the English cap, cape and cope, from the Late Latin cappa, which already could mean cap, cape or hood (OED).

The tail of the hood, often quite long, was called the tippit or liripipe in English, and liripipe or cornette in French. The cape element was a patte in French and in English cape, or sometimes cockscomb when fancily cut. Later a round bourrelet (or rondel) could form part of the assemblage. Patte, cornette and bourrelet were the usual terms in the French of the 15th century Burgundian court, and are used here. In Italian the equivalent terms were foggia, becchetto, and mazzocchio.

Chaperon was sometimes used in English, and also German, for both the hood and hat forms (OED). But the word never appears in the Paston Letters, where there are many references to hats, hoods and bonnets for men. As with all aspects of medieval costume, there are many contemporary images of clothing, and many mentions of names for clothing in contemporary documents, but definitively matching the names to the styles in the images is rarely possible. In Italian the word was cappuccio [kap'put:ʃo], or its diminutive cappuccino, from which come the Capuchin friars, whose distinctive white hood and brown robe led to the monkey and the type of coffee being named after them (it also means the cap of a pen in Italian).

Little Red Riding Hood is Le Petit Chaperon rouge in the earliest published version, by Charles Perrault, and French depictions of the story naturally favour the chaperon over the long riding-hood of ones in English.

In French chaperon was also the term in falconry for the hood placed over a hawk's head when held on the hand to stop it wanting to fly away. It is either this or the headgear meaning that later extended figuratively to become chaperon (in UK English, almost always chaperone) meaning a protective escort, especially for a woman.

== Wearing variations ==
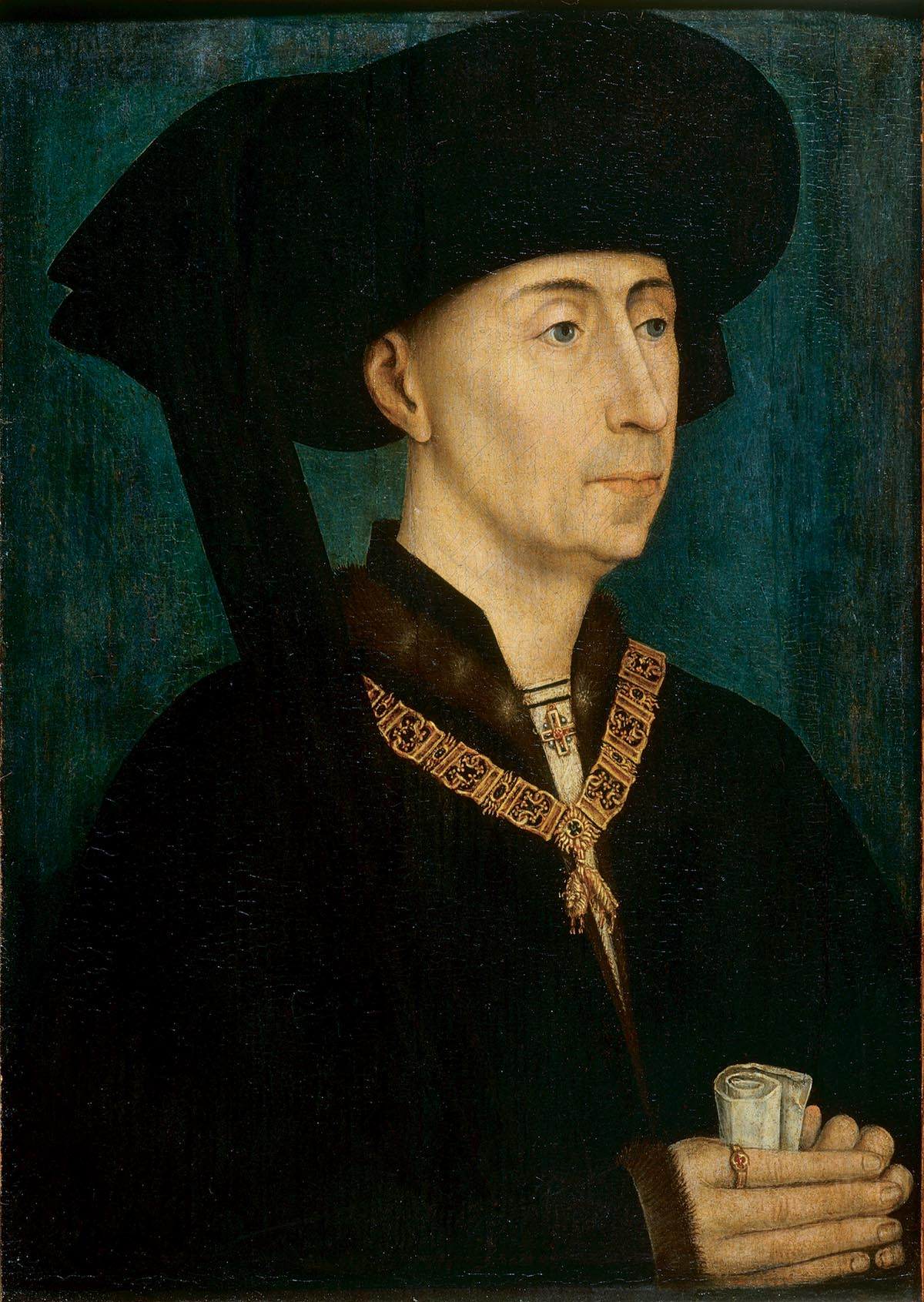
Philip the Good, Duke of Burgundy after Rogier van der Weyden, c. 1450, has an unusually large bourrelet, surely hollow, worn in style D.

About 1300 the chaperon began to be worn by putting the hole intended for the face over the top of the head instead; perhaps in hot weather. This left the cornette tail and the cape or patte, hanging loose from the top of the head. This became fashionable, and chaperons began to be made to be worn in this style. Some authorities only use the term chaperon for this type, calling the earlier forms hoods – which was certainly their usual name in English. This is a categorisation for modern discussions only; there is no dispute over whether chaperon was the contemporary term. See the wearing Colley-Weston-ward of the mandilion for an analogous development in a type of coat.

A padded circular bourrelet (or rondel) evolved, which sat around the head, whilst the cornette became much longer, and gradually more scarf-like in shape, until by the 1430s it was usually straight at the sides and square-ended. Especially in Italy, the cornette was sometimes dispensed with, leaving just an un-flared tubular patte fixed to the bourrelet all round and hanging down to one side of the head. Reed (see refs) calls these sack hats.

By 1400–16, the period of the famous illuminated manuscripts of the Livre de Chasse of Gaston Phoebus (Bibliothèque Nationale, Paris Ms Français 616), and the Très Riches Heures du Duc de Berry chaperons are to be seen worn by many figures. In the famous Calendar scenes of the Trés Riches Heures, they are worn in the original form by the peasants working in the fields, both men and women (February, March and September), and huntsmen (December), and in the new form by some of the courtiers (January and May), who wear coloured and scalloped ones, probably of silk. However, the Duke himself, and the most prominent courtiers, do not wear them. In the Livre de Chasse they are most often worn by the lower huntsmen on foot in the original form, though they and mounted hunters also wear them on top of the head. Figures often have a hood chaperon and a hat as well. Only the original form (trimmed with fur in one case - fol.51V) is worn by the very highest-ranking figures.

By the 1430s most chaperons had become simpler in the treatment of the cloth, and the cornette is long and plain, although the patte may still be elaborately treated with dagging. A perhaps overdressed courtier in a Van der Weyden workshop Exhumation of St Hubert (National Gallery, London NG 783) from this decade still has a very elaborately cut and dagged patte. A figure behind him is wearing his in church, which is unusual (both figures can be paralleled in the Seven Sacraments Altarpiece; see Gallery below).

== Evolved chaperon ==
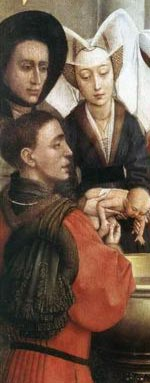
The carried chaperon (style F) of the lower man shows clearly (from bottom) the patte, bourrelet and cornette. The man above has a much larger bourrelet and his patte tied under the chin (1445–50, detail from gallery).

By the middle of the 15th century, the evolved chaperon (worn on top of the head, with bourrelet) had become common wear for males in the upper and middle classes, and were worn in painted portraits, including those of the Dukes of Burgundy. The amount of cloth involved had become considerable, and although chaperons seem to have normally been of a single colour at this period, a silk or damask one would have been a conspicuous sign of affluence. A Florentine chaperon of 1515 is recorded as using sixteen braccia of cloth, over ten yards (9 metres). Chaperons are nearly always shown in art as plain-coloured at this period, but painting a patterned one would have been a daunting task.

The cornette now stretched nearly to the ground, and the patte had also grown slightly; both were now plain and undecorated by cutting or dagging at the edges. Bourrelets could be very large, or quite modest; some were clearly made round a hollow framework (a drawing survives of an Italian block for making them). The largest bourrelets are worn by very high ranking men around 1445–50. Sometimes they seem to be just a ring (the doughnut analogy is hard to resist) with an open centre, and sometimes the opening seems to be at least partly covered with fixed cloth. Because the bourrelets were usually the same shape all the way round, several different parts of it could be worn facing forward. Probably for this reason, chaperons are rarely seen adorned by badges or jewellery. There were now many ways of wearing, and indeed carrying, this most complex and adaptable of hats:

- A) the cornette and patte could be tied together on top of the head, to create a flamboyant turban-like effect, sometimes with a short tail of cornette or patte hanging to the rear.
- B) the patte could be looped under the chin and tied or pinned to the bourrelet on the other side of the face, whilst the cornette hung behind or in front, or was tied on top.
- C) the patte could be worn to the loose to the rear, with the cornette tied on top, or hanging loose to front or rear.
- D) conversely the patte could be tied above, whilst the cornette hung loose to front or rear.
- E) the patte could be worn to the rear, loose or tucked into the other clothes at the back of the neck, whilst the cornette was wrapped round over the top of the head and under the chin a couple of times and secured. This was suitable for cold or windy weather, especially when riding.
- F) when the chaperon needed to be removed, in warm weather, or in the presence of a person much higher in rank (and, usually, in church) it could be put over the shoulder with the patte and cornette hanging on opposite sides, or round the shoulders. Which came forward and which went back varies considerably, but more often the bourrelet went behind. Possibly the chaperon was secured to the shoulder, as the assemblage often looks rather precarious. Donor figures in religious paintings always wear their chaperons in this way, as they are figuratively in the presence of the saints or the Madonna.

Examples of these styles are shown in the illustrations to the article and in the Gallery section below.

== The height of fashion ==
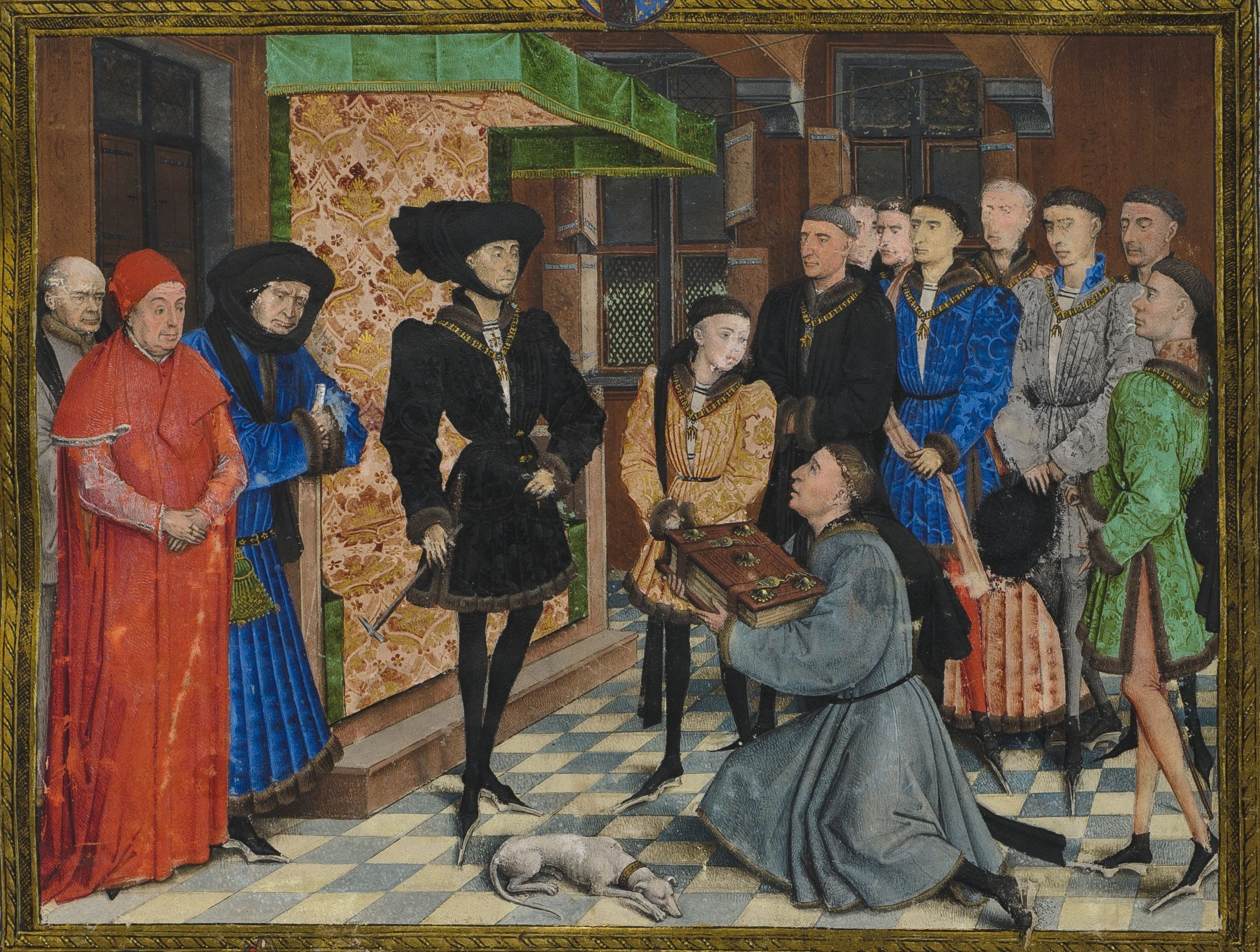
Miniature by Rogier van der Weyden (1447–8). Philip the Good of Burgundy and courtiers (styles B and F; see text)

The only surviving manuscript miniature by Rogier van der Weyden shows Philip the Good wearing a chaperon in style B. Next to him stands Chancellor Nicolas Rolin, using a less exuberant version of style B; only he has sufficient status to wear his chaperon indoors in the Duke's presence. Apart from the Bishop of Tournai, next to Rolin, all the other men are bare-headed, even Philip's young heir, despite the fact that several of them are high-ranking intimates who, like the Duke, wear the collar of the Order of the Golden Fleece. But as far as can be seen, all have hats. The man in grey seems to be carrying another sort of hat, but all the other ones visible are chaperons worn in style F, mostly with the cornettes to the front. The young Charles the Bold has his patte wrapped round the back of his neck, and the man on the extreme right has his bourrelet further than usual down his back, with the patte hanging down from it. Most of the chaperons are black, although the man in blue has one in salmon-pink; black was having one of its earliest periods of being the most fashionable colour at the time.

The chaperon never became quite this dominant in Italy or France; nor does it seem to have been worn as often by grand personages, although this is sometimes the case. There is a famous bust of Lorenzo de' Medici wearing one, although in this he may be deliberately avoiding ostentatious dress (see gallery section). They are more characteristic of merchants and lawyers in these countries, for example in the images of Jean Fouquet from the mid-century. In England, on the other hand, almost all the non-royal members of the Order of the Garter are shown wearing them in their portraits in "William Bruges' Garter Book" of 1430–1440 (British Library, Stowe MS 594). In the Holy Roman Empire, Spain and Portugal they were generally less common, & appeared lower down the social scale. They were apparently never worn by the clergy anywhere.

== Political chaperons ==
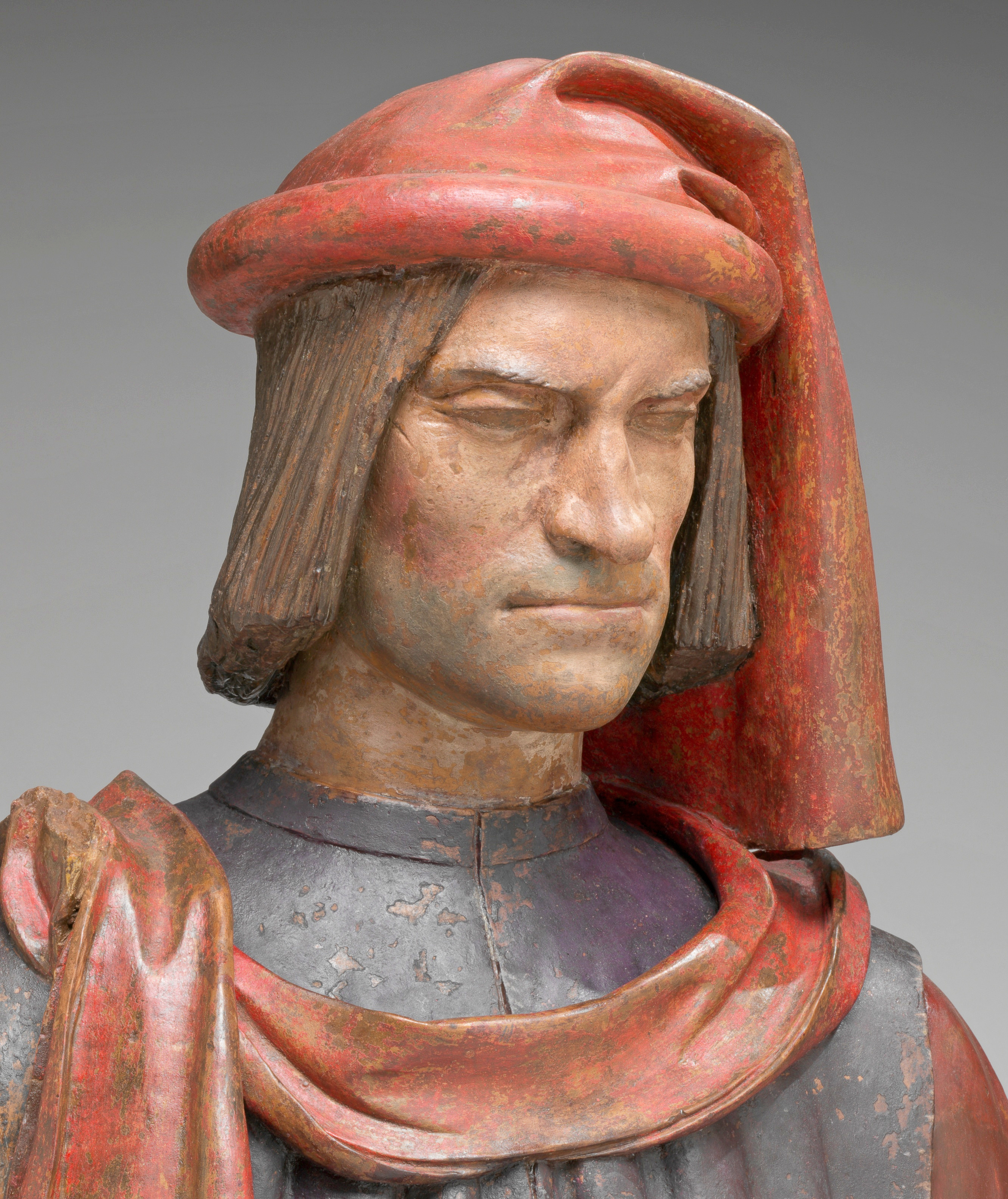
Lorenzo de' Medici after Verrocchio, later than 1478, wearing a rather simple chaperon. The larger styles are now outdated, plus he is projecting a political message as Pater Patriae.

Chaperons were used in France and Burgundy to denote, by their colour, allegiance to a political faction. The factions themselves were also sometimes known as chaperons. During the captivity in England of King John II of France in 1356, the participants in a popular uprising in Paris against his son, the future Charles V, wore parti-coloured chaperons of red, for Paris, and blue for Navarre as they supported the claim to the French throne of King Charles the Bad of Navarre. In 1379 the ever-difficult citizens of Ghent rose up against Duke Philip the Bold of Burgundy wearing white chaperons. White was also worn in factional disturbances in Paris in 1413, by opponents of the Armagnacs, during one of King Charles VI's bouts of madness.

The chaperon was one of the items of male clothing that featured in the charges brought against Joan of Arc at her trial in 1431. This was apparently a hat rather than a hood, as she was stated to have taken it off in front of the Dauphin – this was cited as further damning evidence of her assuming male behaviours.

In 15th century Florence, cappucci were associated with republicans, as opposed to courtiers (see gallery). An advisor to the Medici told them in 1516 that they should get as many young men to wear "the courtier's cap" rather than the cappucci. A cappucci was more practical; in urban areas, such as Florence, when seeing a person of higher rank on the street it was simply touched deferentially or pushed back on the head slightly.

== The cappuccio in Renaissance art ==
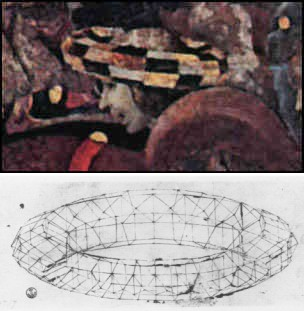
Above: A mazzocchio, perhaps worn by himself, in the Louvre portion of The Battle of San Romano by Paolo Uccello, c. 1435–1440. Below: Perspective study of a torus by Paolo Uccello, c. 1430–1440.

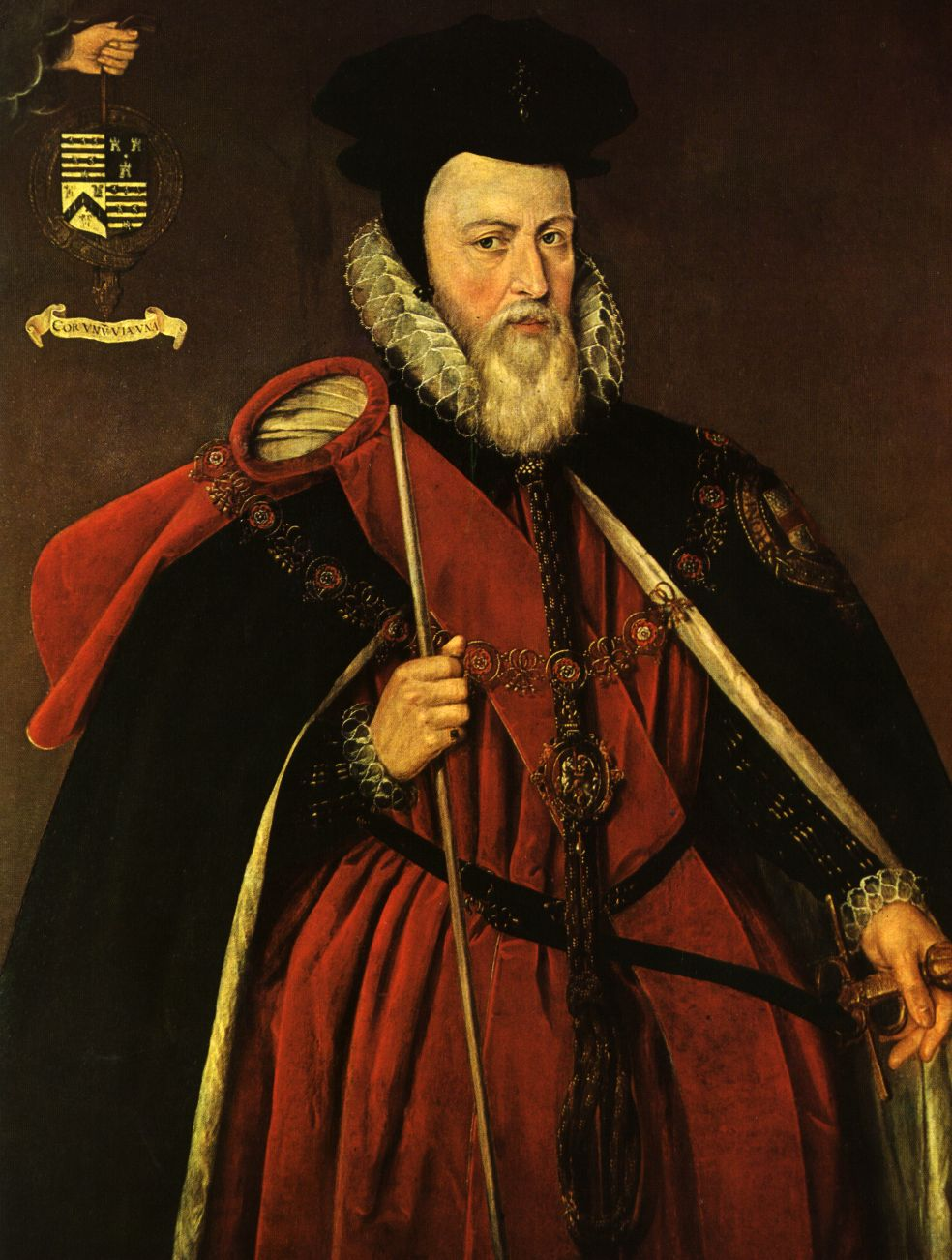
William Cecil, 1st Baron Burghley in his Order of the Garter robes, c. 1595, with vestigial bourrelet, the cornette worn as a sort of sash, tucked under a belt, and the patte off to the left. On his head he wears a cap.

In addition to being featured in many Renaissance portraits by virtue of being the fashion of the day, the Italian cappuccio was of interest because the mazzocchio's shape made it a good subject for the developing art of perspective. The painter Paolo Uccello studied the perspective of the mazzocchio and incorporated it in some of his paintings (e.g. in The Counterattack of Michelotto da Cotignola at the Battle of San Romano).

Apart from portraits, many of the best, and least formal, depictions of the chaperon in art come from paintings of the Nativity and other scenes of the early life of Christ. It is of course always winter, when the chaperon was most likely to be worn. Saint Joseph is especially useful, as it is never part of his depiction to be fashionably dressed, and it is part of his character in the period that he is often shown quite dishevelled (see examples below). The shepherds are the lower-class figures most often shown in a large scale in paintings of the period.

== Decline ==
By about 1480 the chaperon was ceasing to be fashionable, but continued to be worn. The size of the bourrelet was reduced, and the patte undecorated. St Joseph could, by this stage, often be seen with the evolved form. By 1500 the evolved chaperon was definitely outmoded in Northern Europe, but the original hood form still remained a useful headgear for shepherds and peasants. By this time the evolved chaperon had become fixed in some forms of civilian uniforms for lawyers, academics and the members of some knightly orders, such as the Order of the Garter. In these uses it gradually shrank in size and often became permanently attached to the clothing underneath, effectively just as an ornament, in its present form, as a part of academic dress, called an epitoge. In Italy it remained more current, more as a dignified form of headgear for older men, until about the 1520s.

== Funerary ornaments on horses ==
In a later related use of the term, the name chaperoon passed to certain little shields, or escutcheons, and other funeral devices, placed on the foreheads of horses that drew the hearses to processional funerals. These were called chaperoons or shafferoons, as they were originally fastened to the chaperonnes, or hoods, worn by those horses with their other coverings of state. (See also Frentera.)

== Gallery ==
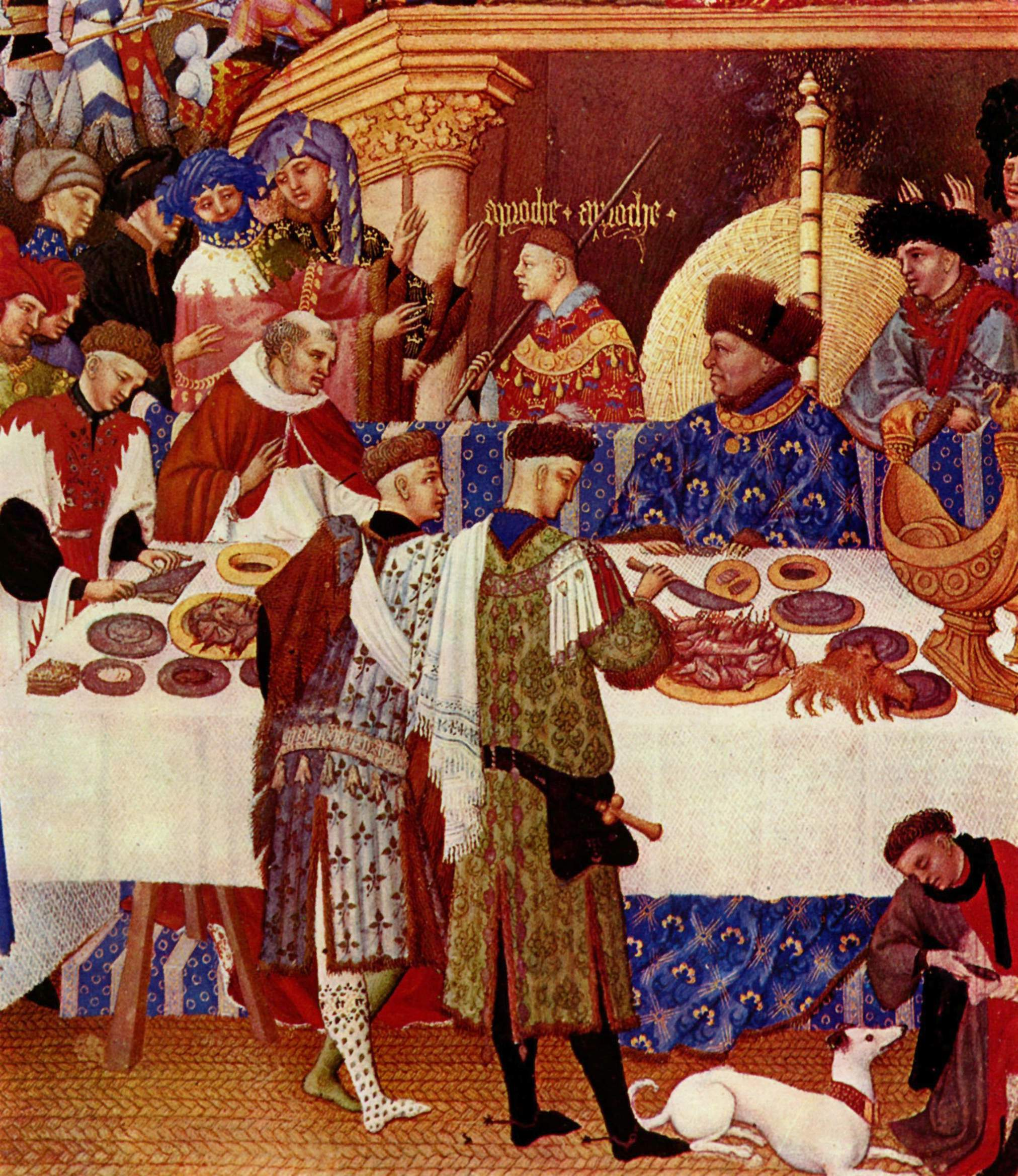
Les Très Riches Heures du duc de Berry, January (detail), c. 1410. The two courtiers standing behind the table to the left wear elaborately cut and dagged patterned chaperons.

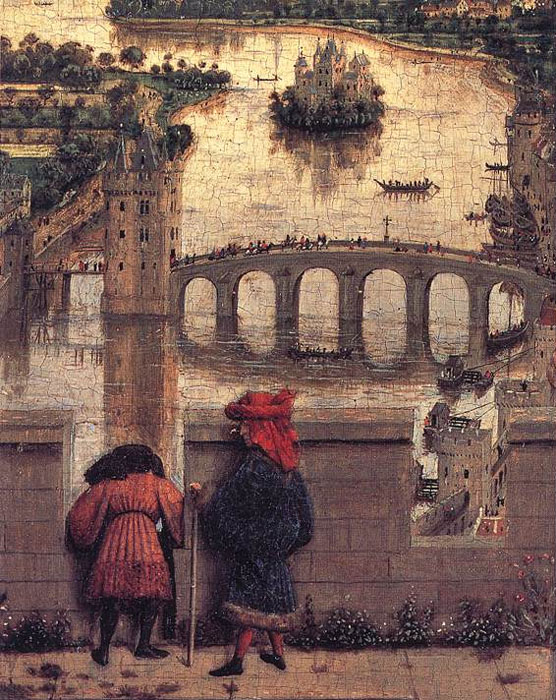
Detail of Jan van Eyck's Rolin Madonna, c. 1435. Two citizens wear their pattes behind in style C. The cornette of the one on the left can be seen in front of him.

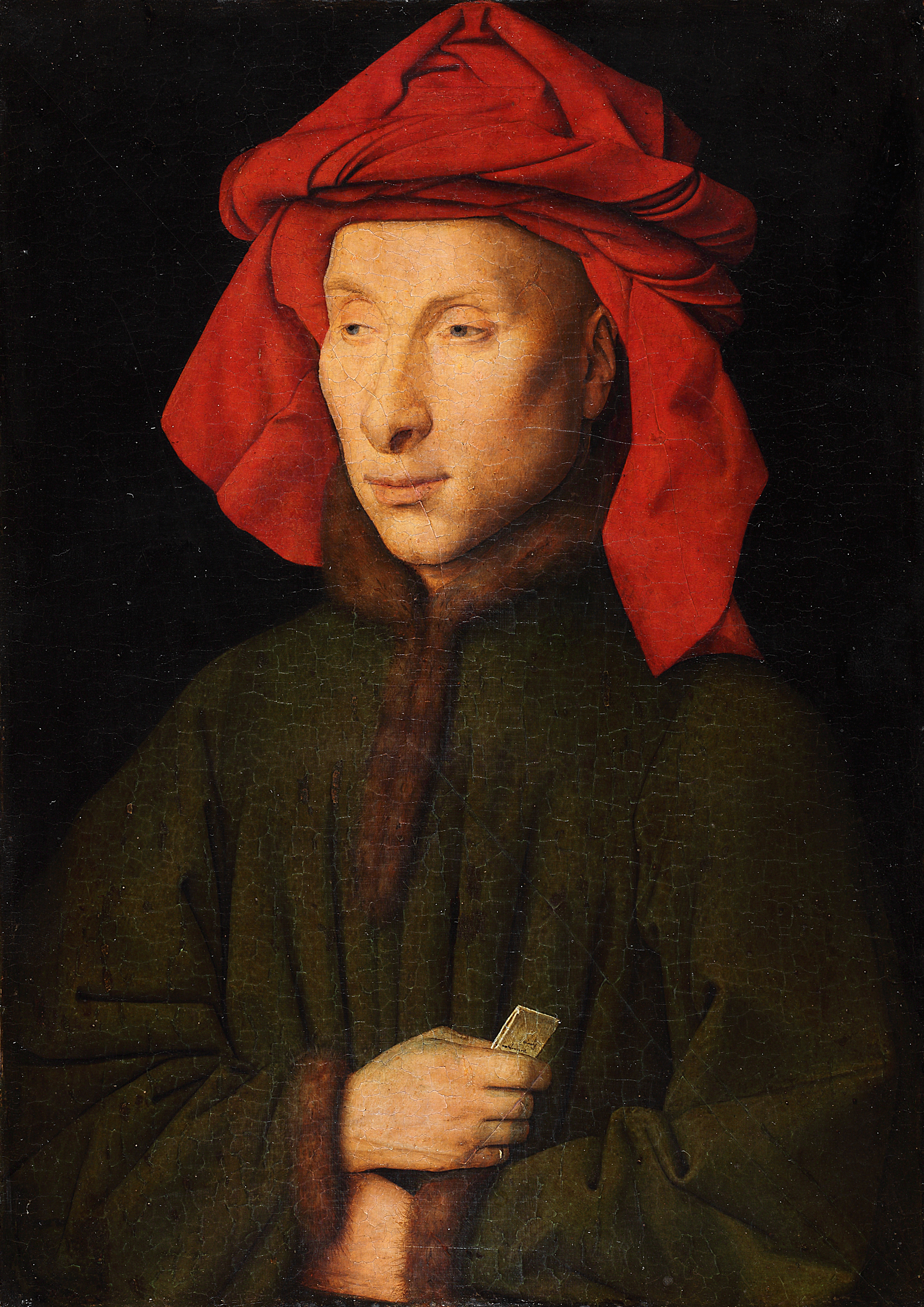
Portrait presumed to be of Giovanni Arnolfini by Jan van Eyck, c. 1438. The chaperon is worn with cornette tied on top of the head, and the patte hanging behind (style C). The bourrelet is twisted.

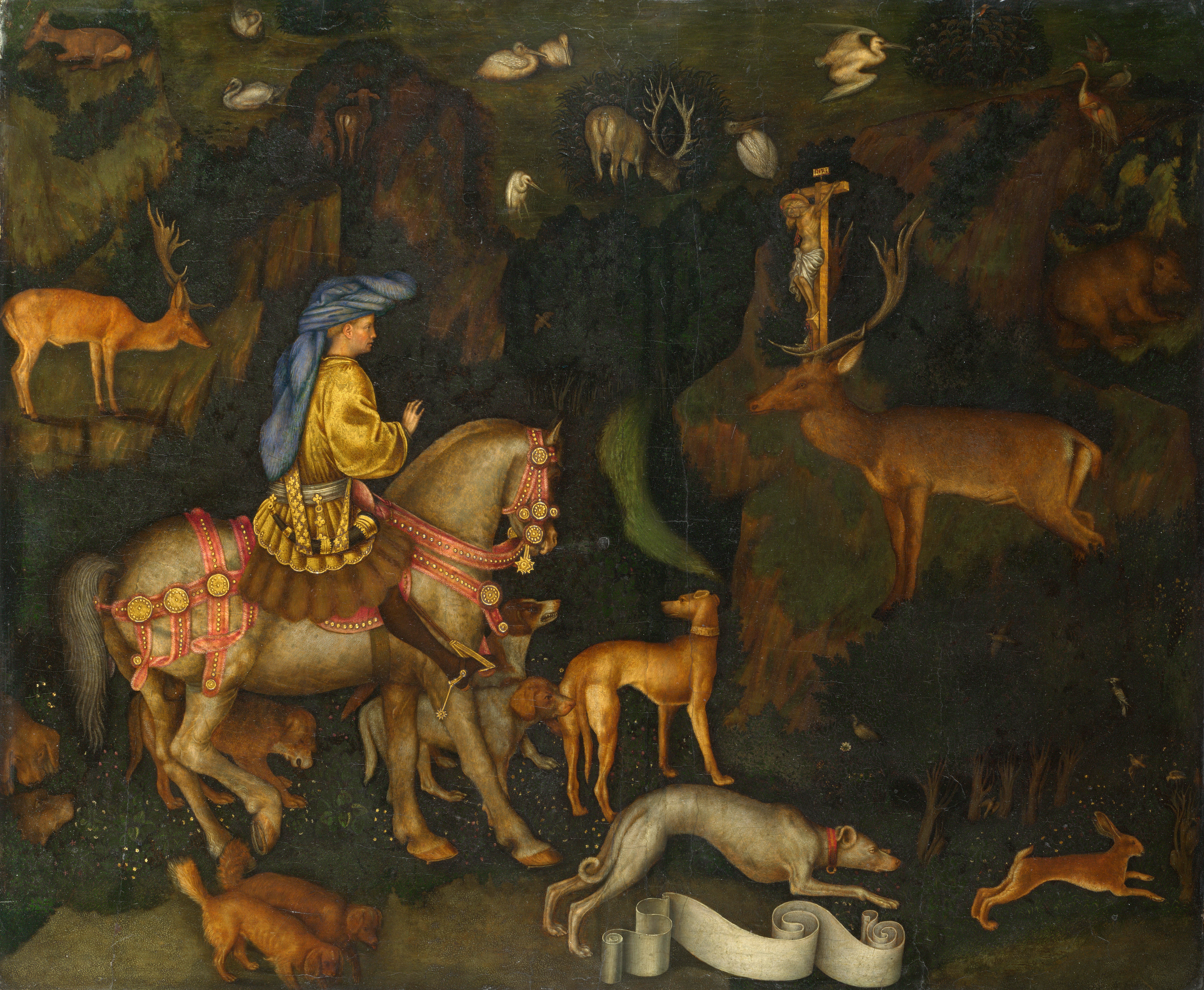
The Vision of Saint Eustace by Pisanello, c. 1440. The dandyish saint wears an especially voluminous chaperon in style A. As with some other hats by Pisanello, the depiction may be rather exaggerated compared to hats worn in reality.

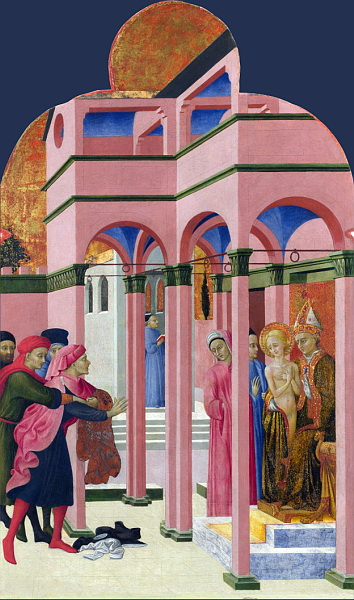
St Francis renounces his father by Sassetta, 1437–44. The father's patte, or possibly cornette, appears to be wound vertically through the bourrelet, which is rather flat. He wears a matching cloak. The companion who restrains him has a chaperon that looks like a turban.

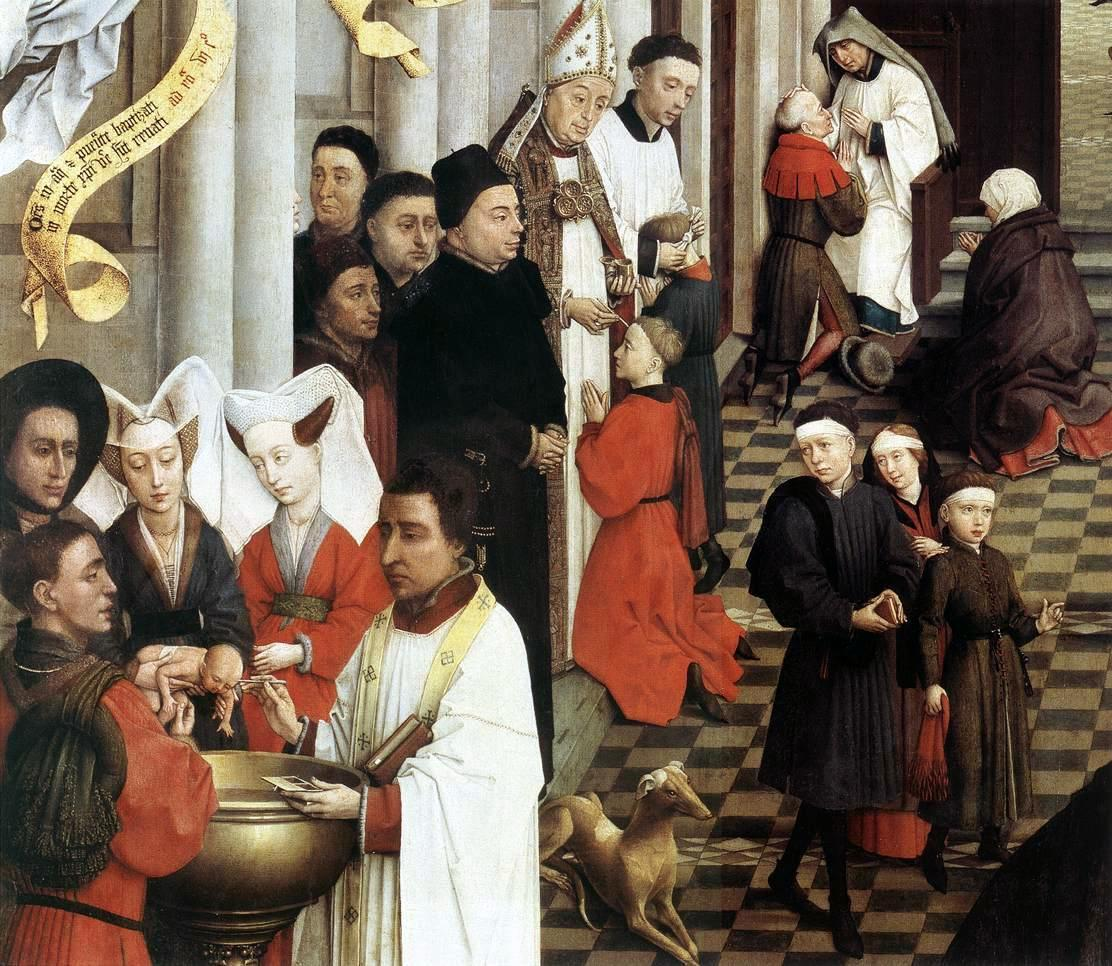
Rogier van der Weyden's Seven Sacraments Altarpiece: Baptism, Confirmation, and Penance, 1445–50. The man on the extreme left gives a clear view of his dagged patte. The father of the baby above him is wearing his in church. The three boys being confirmed also have chaperons. The old man confessing has a cut hood chaperon as well as a hat on the floor.

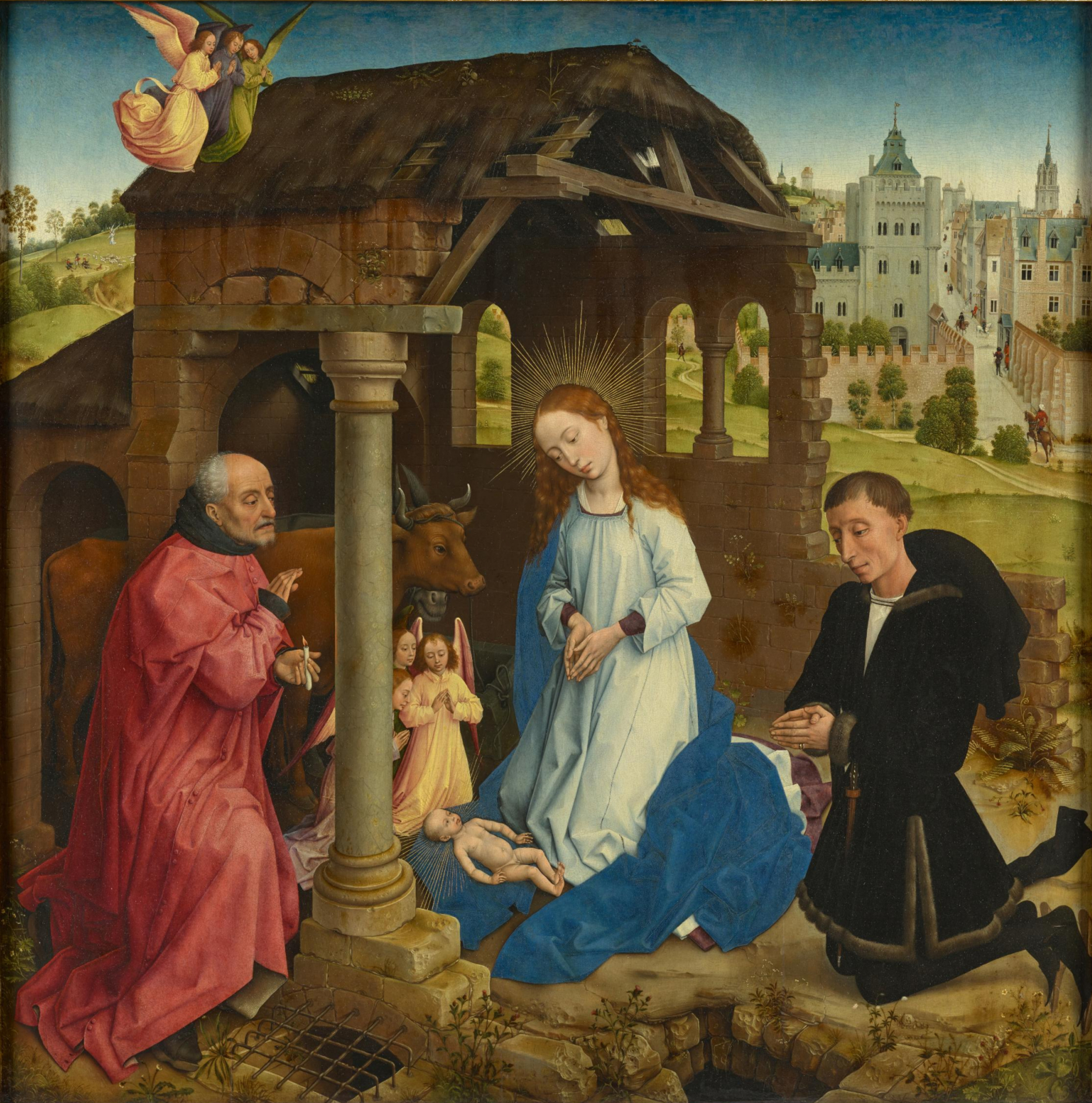
Nativity by Rogier van der Weyden, 1446. St Joseph wears a small unevolved chaperon, pulled back off the head. The richly dressed donor has his evolved chaperon hanging behind him, with a large bourrelet and the long cornette trailing on the ground above his feet.

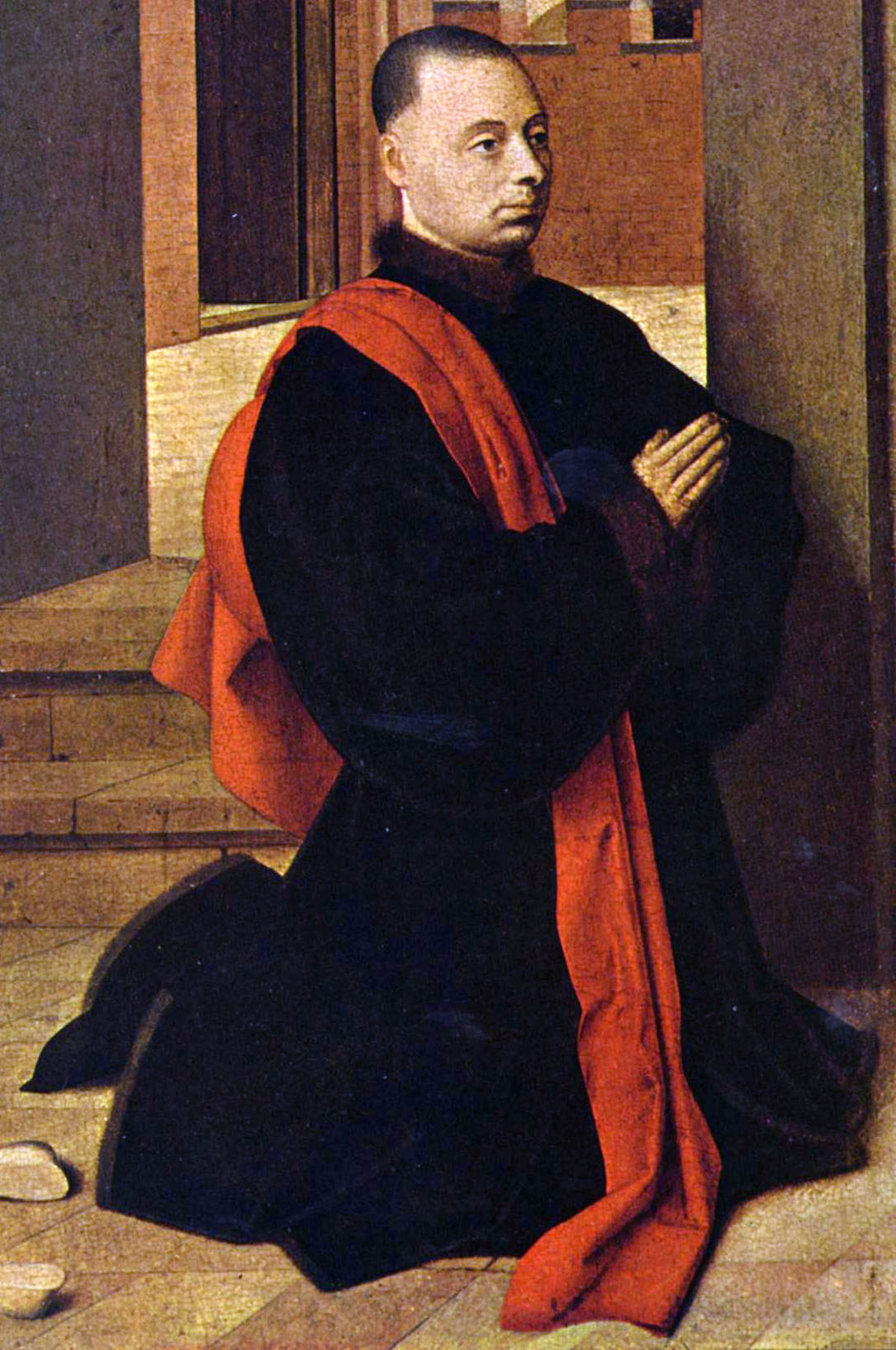
Donor figure by Petrus Christus c. 1450. The chaperon is carried over the shoulder, with the cornette to the front, in style F.

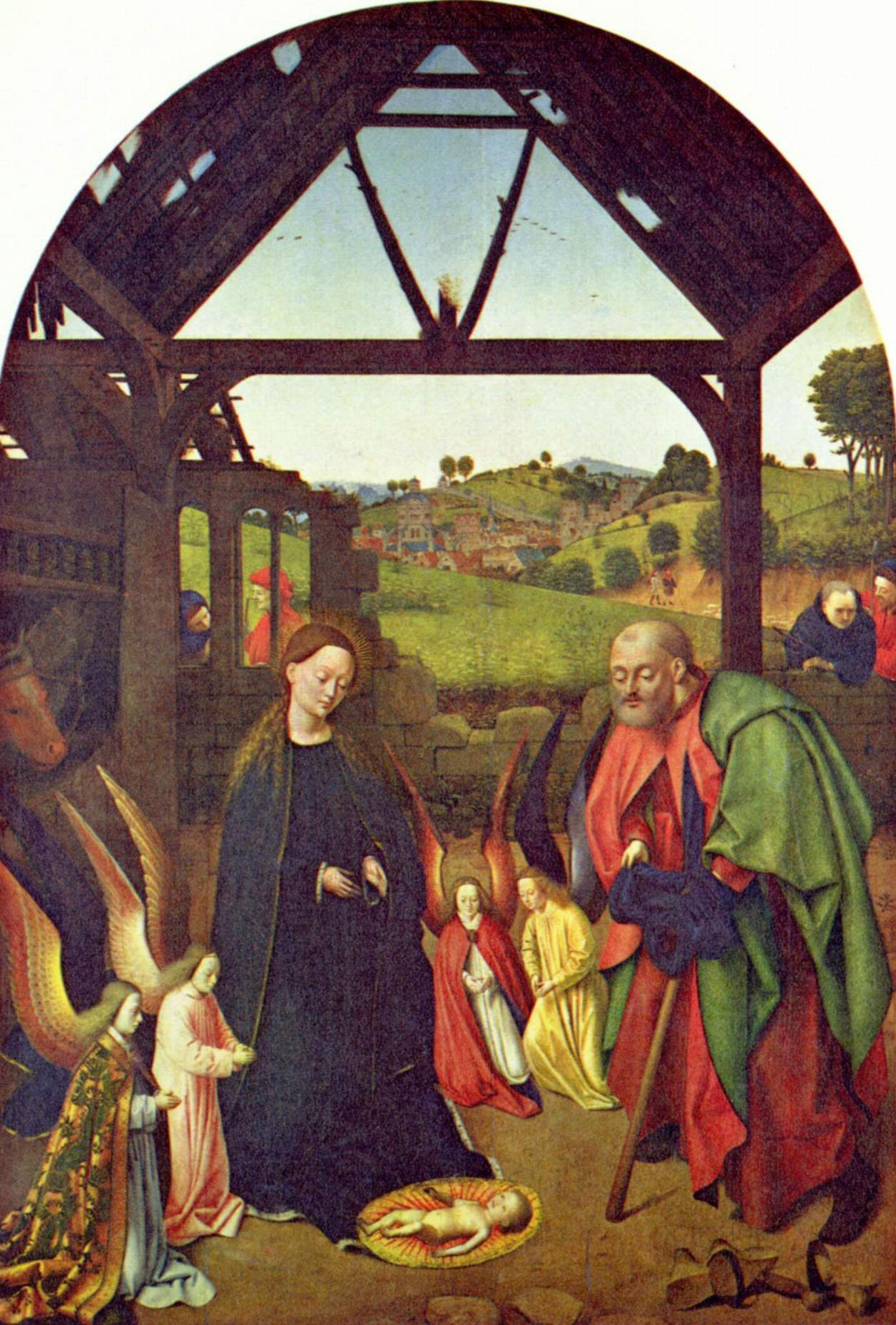
Nativity by Petrus Christus, c. 1450. St Joseph carries his purple chaperon in a tangle in his hand, with the cornette vanishing into his other clothes.

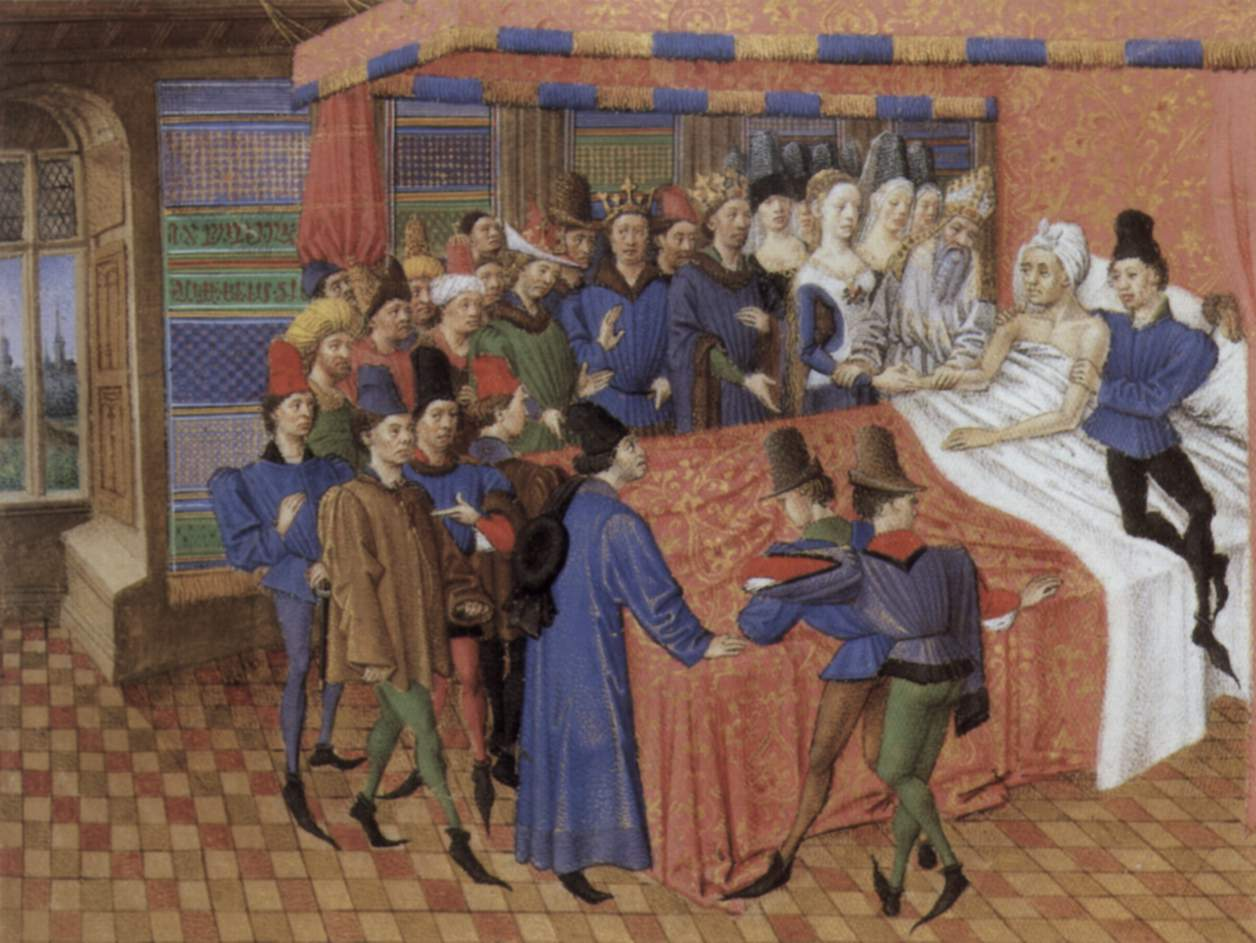
Miniature by the Master of Jouvenel des Oursins, 1460. The near courtier has a chaperon over his shoulder as well as a hat. Behind the bed some Eastern princes wear turbans.

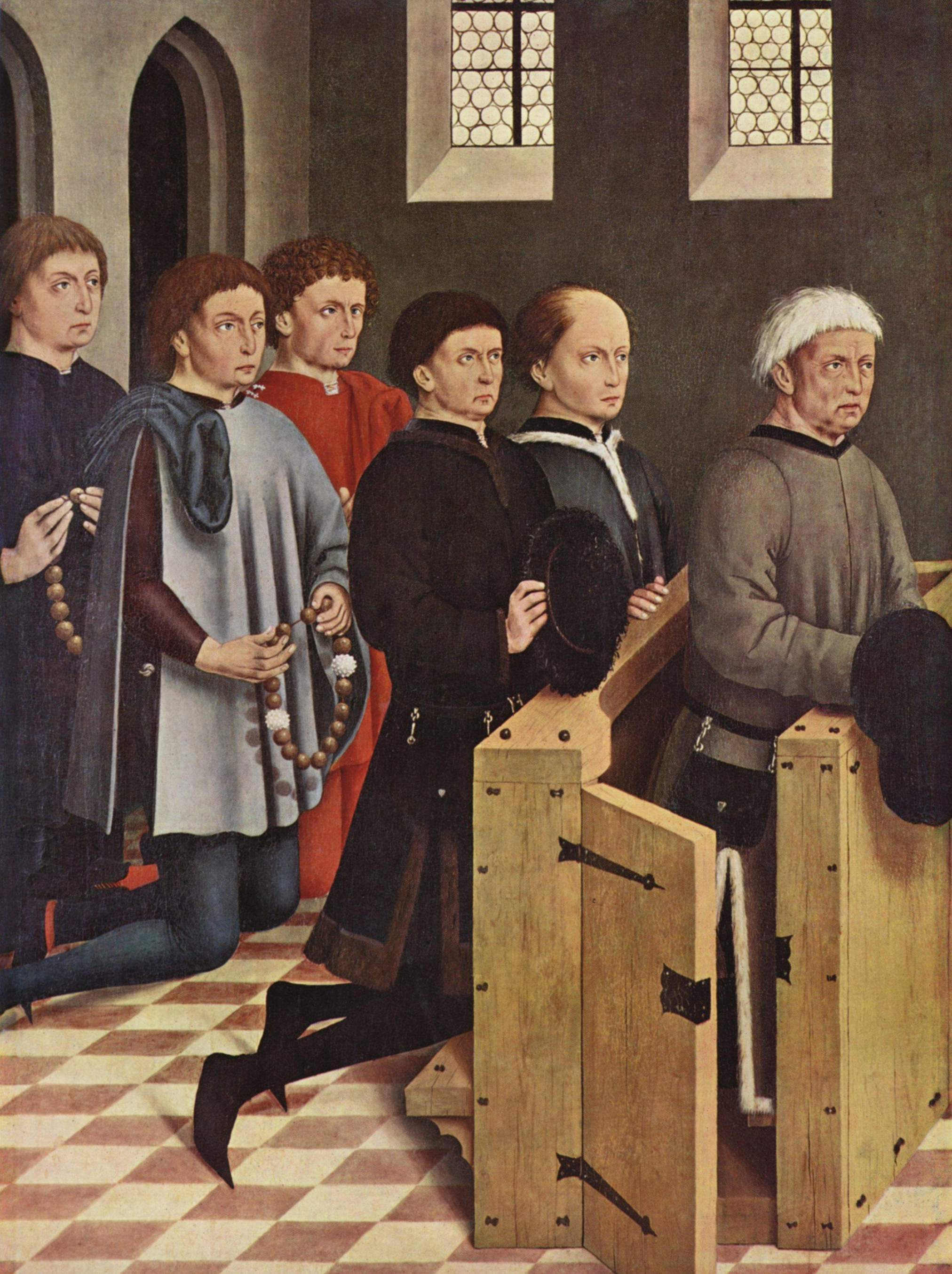
Friedrich Herlin, 1462–5. Typically for Germany, the highest status men (with kneelers) have fur (?) hats, whilst the sons with chaperons kneel on the floor.

Presentation at the Temple by the Master of the Prado Annunciation, or Hans Memling, 1470s. St Joseph wears a working-mans chaperon in the original style, whilst the relative at right wears a simple evolved one.

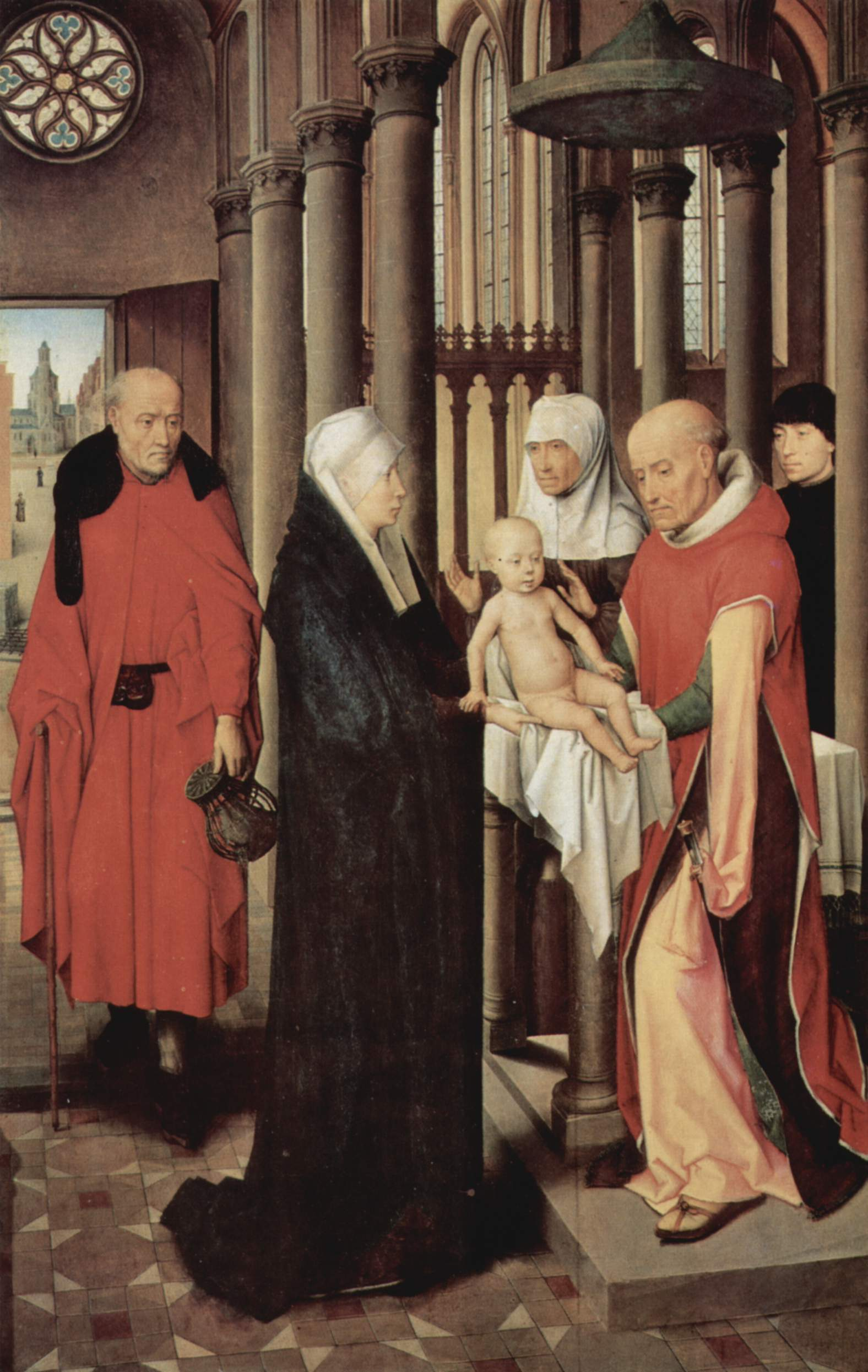
another Presentation at the Temple by Hans Memling c. 1470. St Joseph now wears an evolved but simple chaperon with a short cornette around his shoulders.

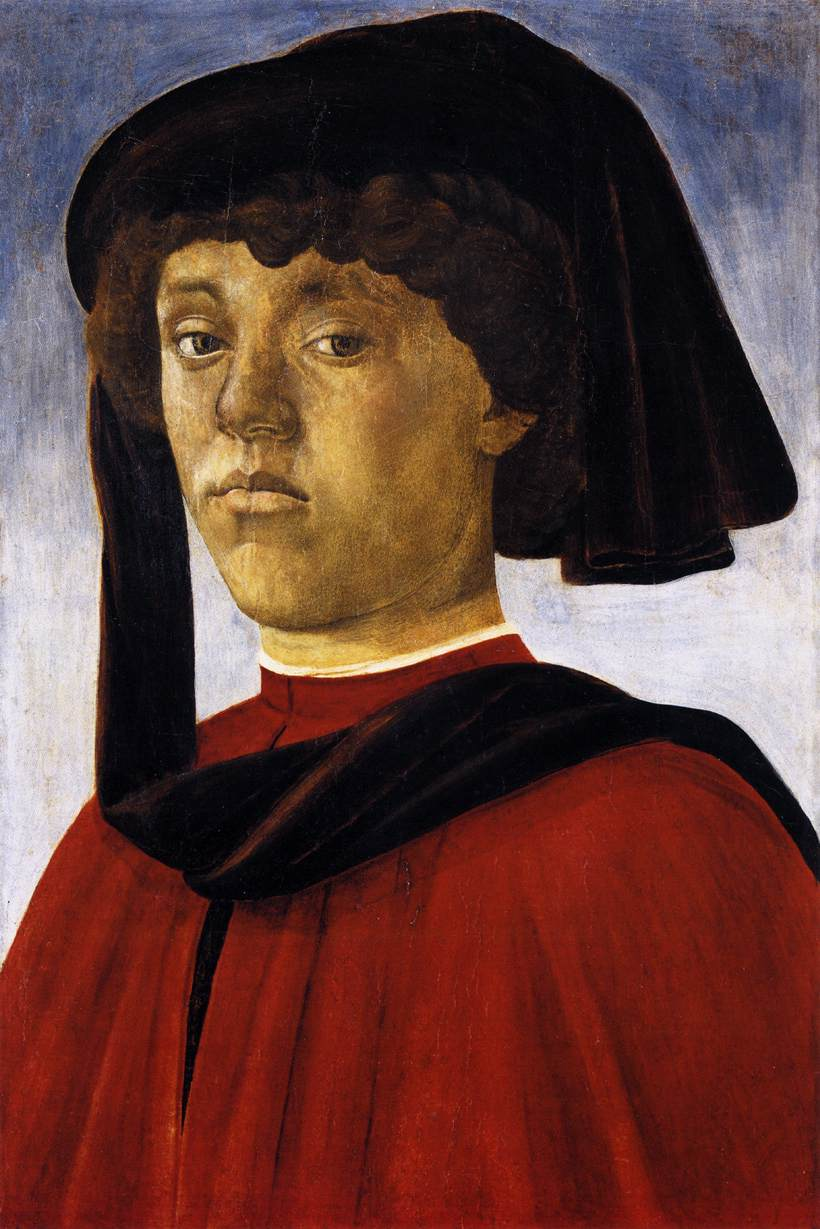
Portrait of a Young Man (Botticelli, Pitti Palace), Florence c. 1469. The cornette draped round at the front is typically Italian.

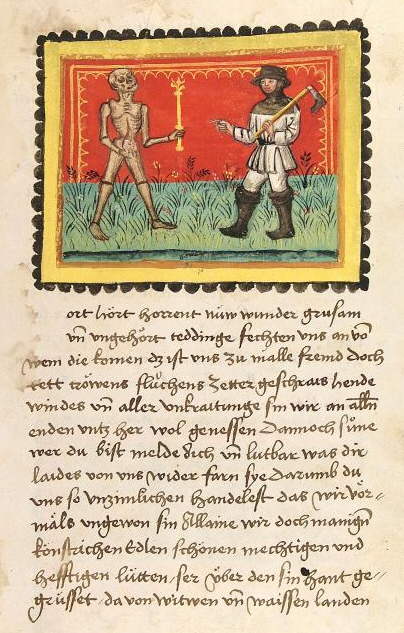
German peasant (of c. 1470) with a hat over a hood-style chaperon.

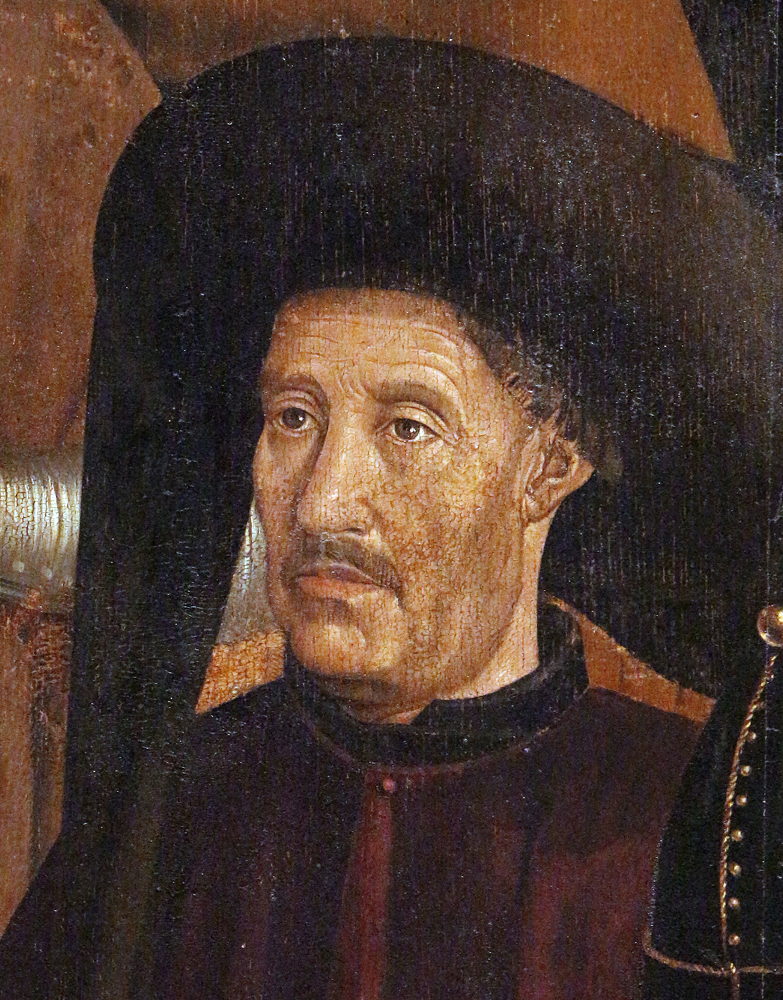
Detail of a man with moustache and Burgundian-style chaperon in the Saint Vincent Panels (dated c. 1470 and attributed to painter Nuno Gonçalves), commonly identified as Prince Henry the Navigator.

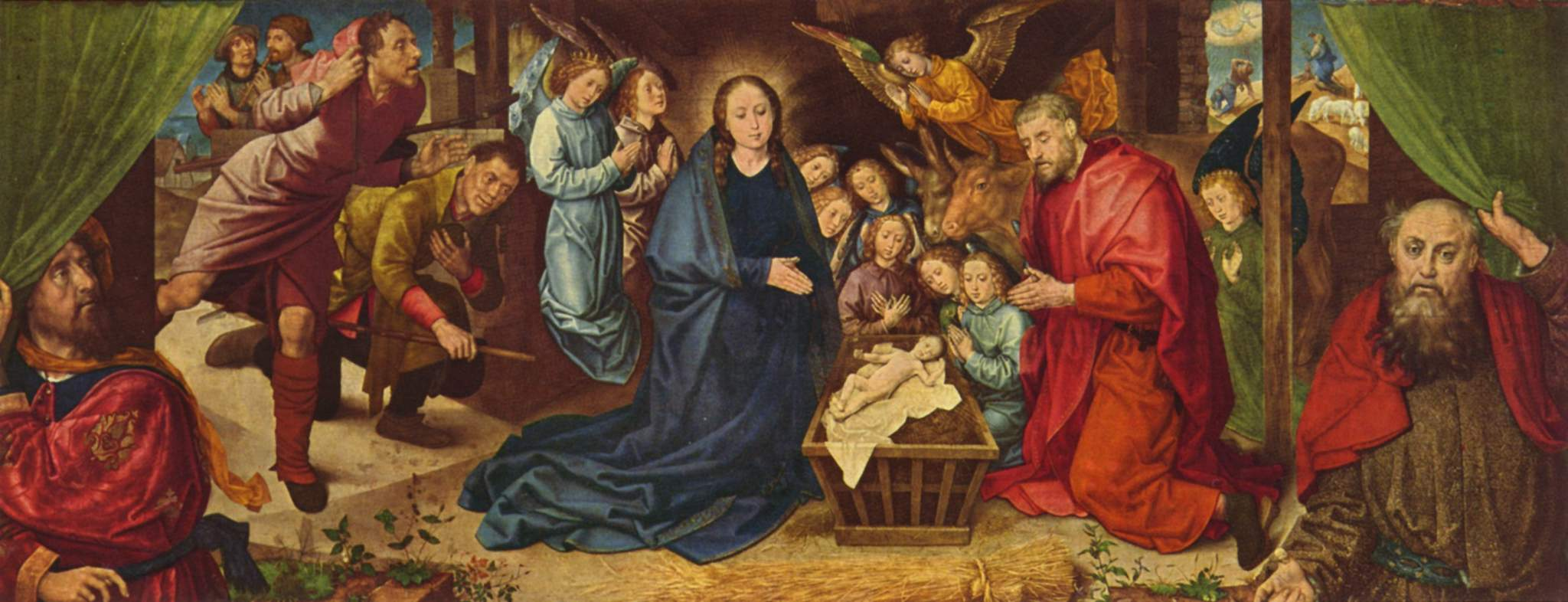
Nativity by Hugo van der Goes, 1480. The figures holding back the curtain wear chaperons with short cornettes.

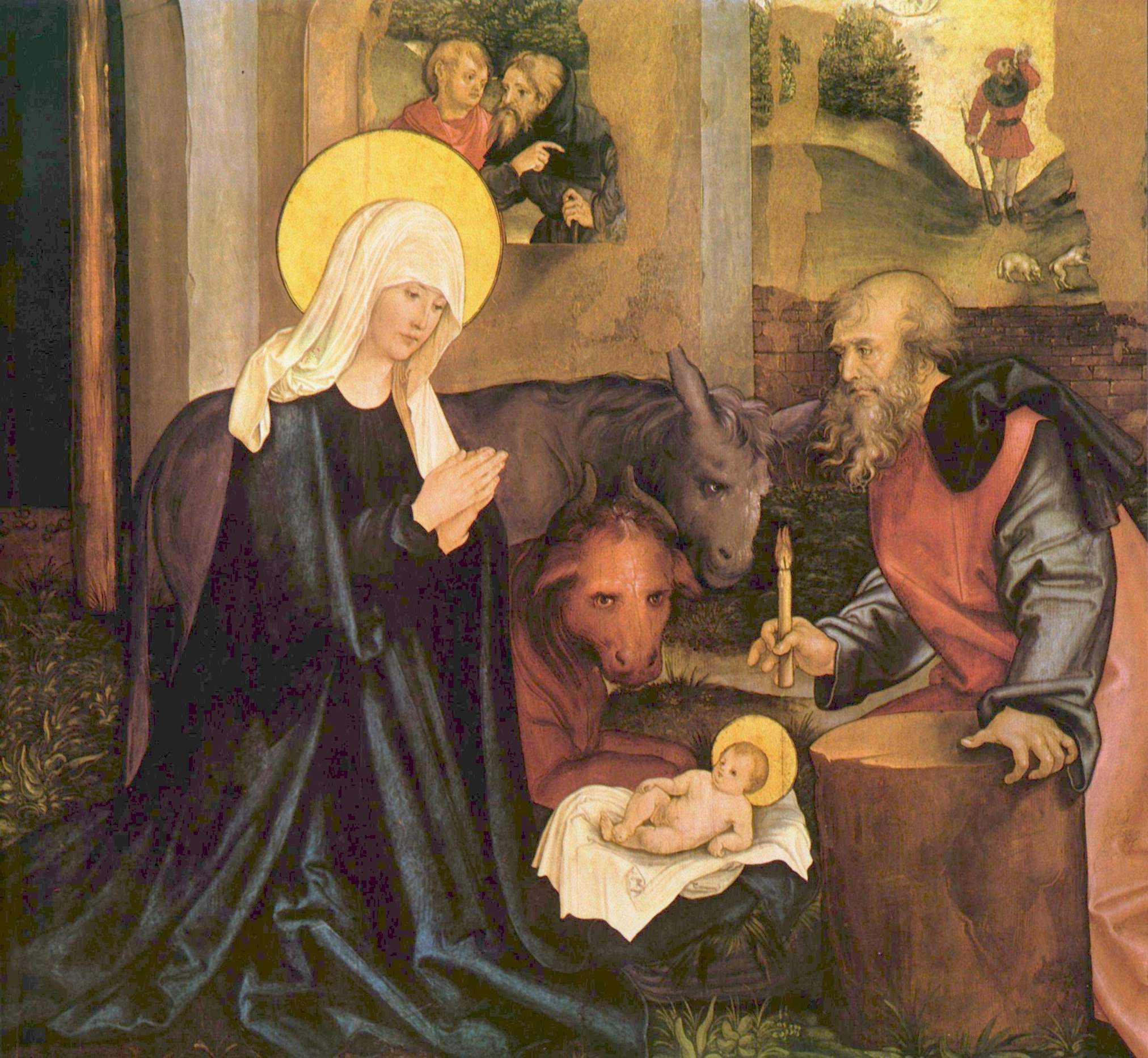
Nativity by Hans Schäufelein, c. 1507. By now the chaperon is back to being work clothing. St Joseph has his over his shoulder, and all the shepherds have them, with the hood pulled back.

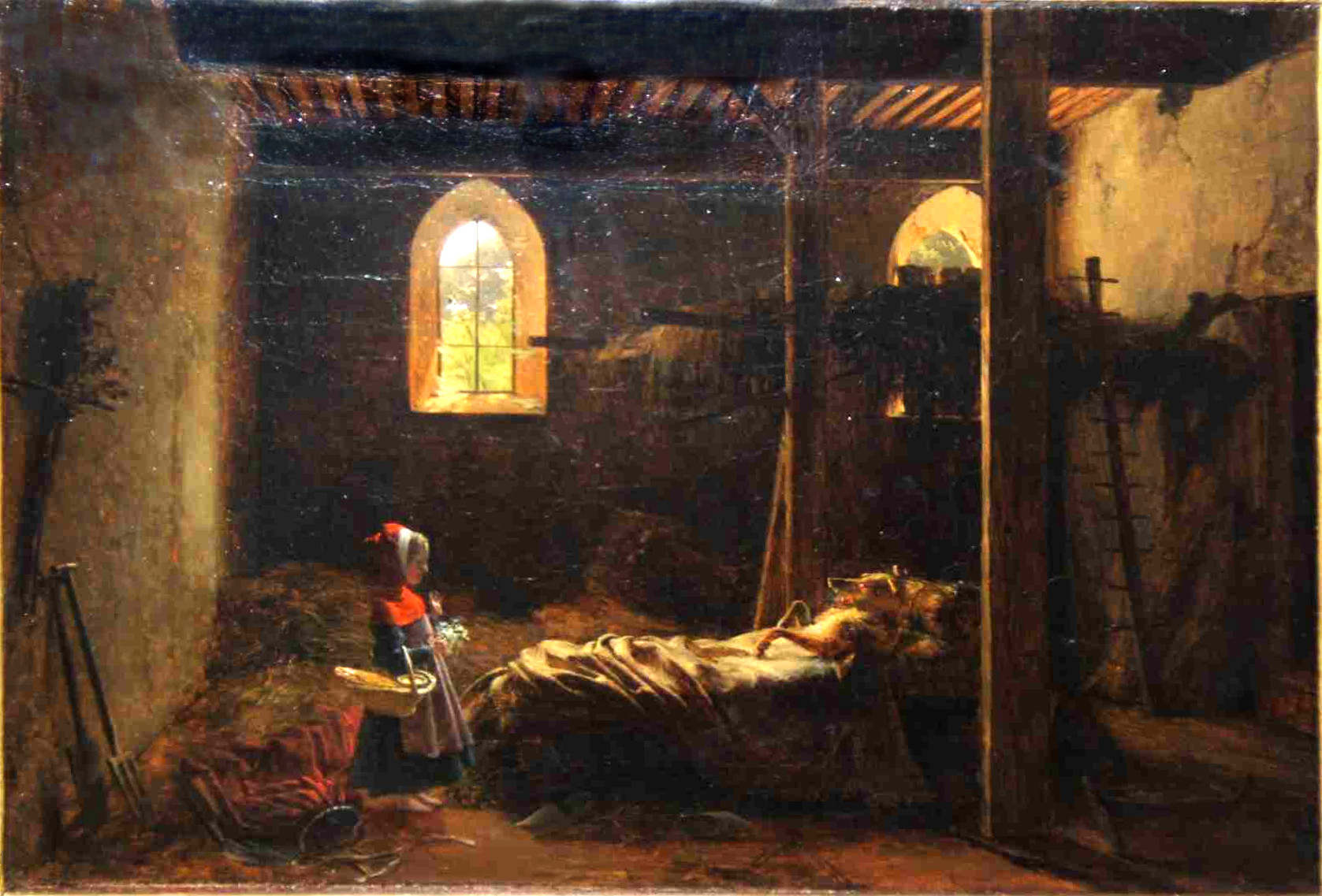
Le Petit Chaperon Rouge by the French painter Fleury François Richard (1777–1852), Louvre. French depictions of the story naturally favour the chaperon over the long riding-hood of ones in English.

== See also ==
- List of hat styles
