= Portrait of Giovanni di Nicolao Arnolfini =

Painting by Jan van Eyck

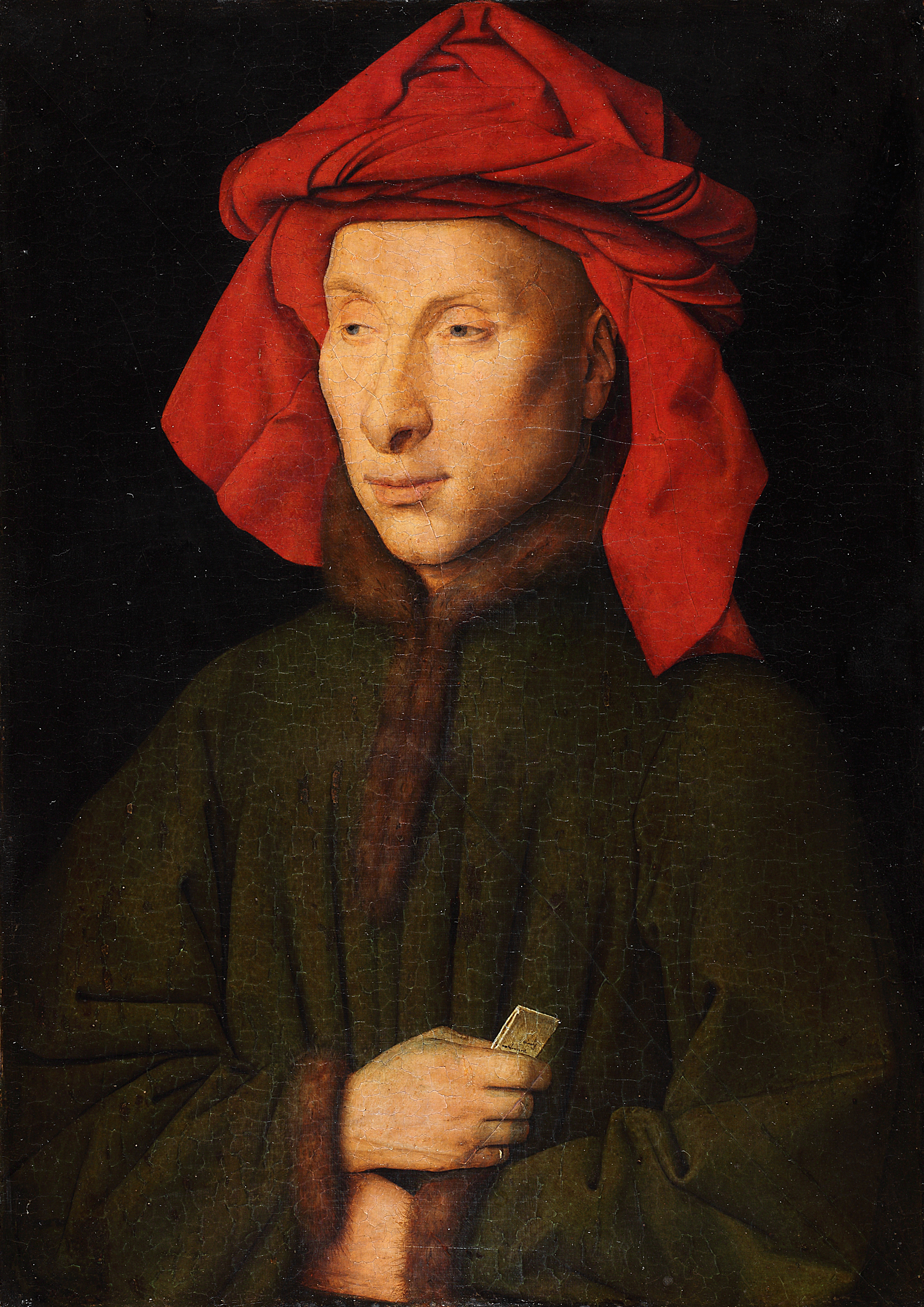
- Artist: Jan van Eyck
- Year: c. 1438
- Dimensions: 29 cm × 20 cm (11 in × 7.9 in)
- Location: Gemäldegalerie; Berlin

Portrait of Giovanni di Nicolao Arnolfini (or Portrait of a Man in a Red Chaperon) is a small c. 1438 portrait by Jan van Eyck believed to be the same person as in the famous 1434 Arnolfini Portrait due to the similarities of facial features. Thus, the work is van Eyck's second portrait of Giovanni di Nicolao Arnolfini, a wealthy merchant from Lucca, a city in Tuscany in central Italy, who spent most of his life in Flanders.

The painting was long thought a self-portrait; in colourisation, costume and tone, it is very similar to the signed and dated Portrait of a Man in a Red Chaperon in London, which is generally accepted as a self-portrait. It was only later that the current work was associated with Arnolfini and the double marriage painting. Today, the painting is held by the Berlin Gemäldegalerie (State Museum).

== Description ==
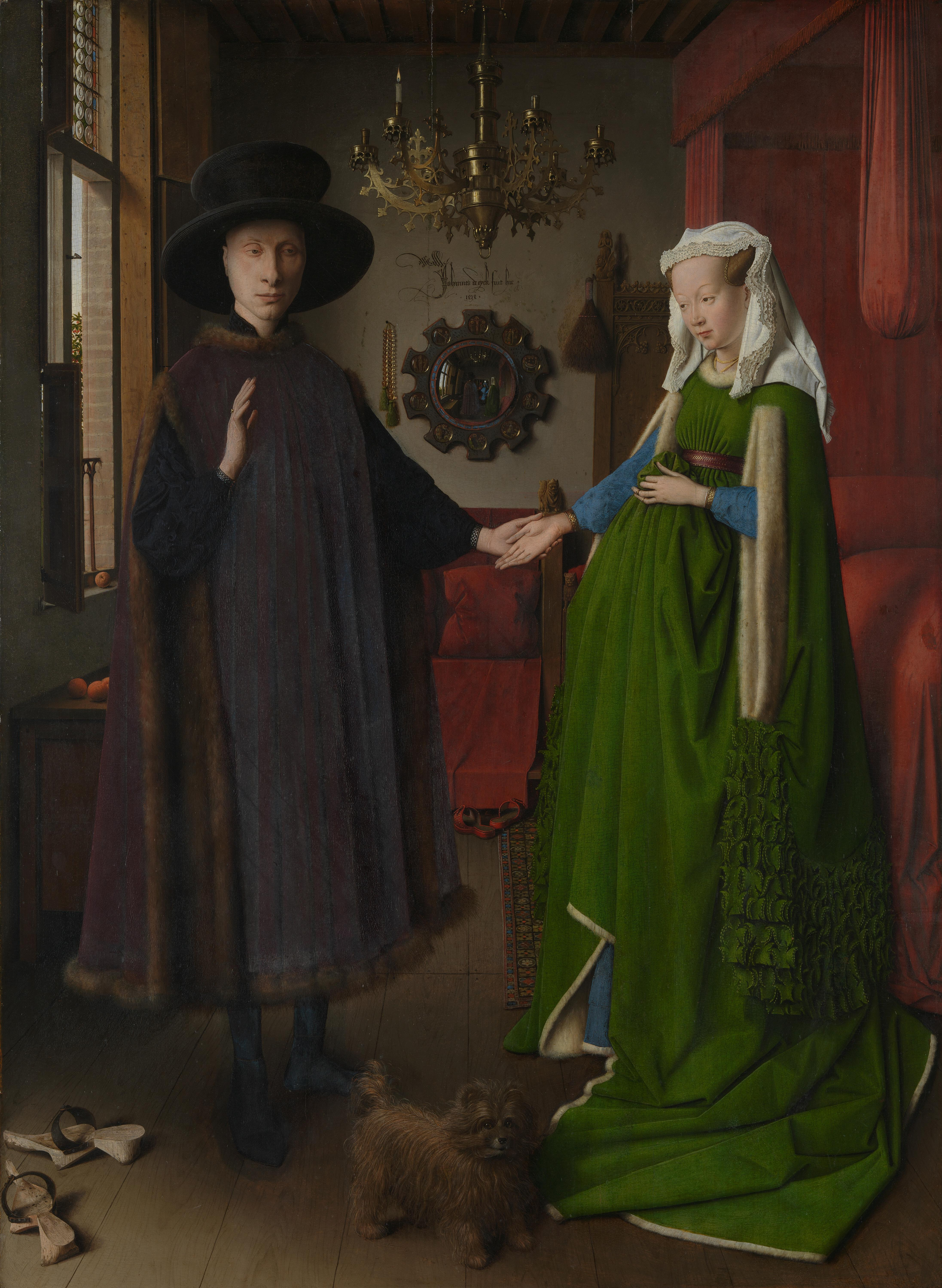
Jan van Eyck, Arnolfini Portrait, 1432. National Gallery, London

Arnolfini wears a dark green gown with dark brown fur lining. He wears a red chaperon with cornette tied on top of the head, with the patte hanging behind. The bourrelet is twisted. He is depicted with exacting realism; no attempt is made to gloss over his facial imperfections. He has small, slightly oriental eyes, a large nose and an inscrutable stare.

The meaning and significance of the scroll held in his left hand is unknown. It may relate to finance and trade, it might be a type of international credit note that was then just being introduced to European banking.

Arnolfini's folded arms would have rested on the original, but now lost, frame. As with van Eyck's other single-head portraits, the frame would have contained inscriptions giving the date of completion. Opinion as to the date of the painting has varied, with the likely dates ranging from 1434 to 1438. Today the later date is generally accepted.

That van Eyck painted two portraits of Arnolfini has led to speculation he was a friend of the artist. For many years the two works were not associated, and the identity of the sitters was unknown. Often the London double portrait was taken as a portrait of the artist and his wife, Margaret. In 1857, Crowe and Cavalcaselle linked the London double portrait with the early 16th-century inventories of Margaret of Austria, and established the sitters as Giovanni [di Arrigo] Arnolfini and his (possibly already deceased) wife, Giovanna Cenami.

== See also ==
- List of works by Jan van Eyck

== Sources ==
- Ferrari, Simone. Van Eyck: Masters of Art. Munich: Prestel, 2013. ISBN 3-7913-4826-4
- Hall, Edwin, The Arnolfini Betrothal: Medieval Marriage and the Enigma of Van Eyck's Double Portrait, Berkeley: University of California Press, 1994, ISBN 0-520-08251-6
- Borchert, Till-Holger. Van Eyck. London: Taschen, 2008. ISBN 3-8228-5687-8
- Ridderbos, Bernhard; Van Buren, Anne; Van Veen, Henk. Early Netherlandish Paintings: Rediscovery, Reception and Research. Amsterdam: Amsterdam University Press, 2005. ISBN 0-89236-816-0
