= Portrait of a Man (Self Portrait?) =

Painting by Jan van Eyck

- Artist: Jan van Eyck
- Year: 1433
- Medium: Oil on oak panel
- Dimensions: 25.5 cm × 19 cm (10.0 in × 7.5 in)
- Location: National Gallery, London
- Accession: NG222

Portrait of a Man (Self Portrait?) (earlier Portrait of a Man in a Red Turban) is the title given to a small oil painting by the Early Netherlandish painter Jan van Eyck, completed in 1433 in Bruges. The inscription at the top of the frame, which is original, contains his motto Als Ich Can (intended as the pun "as I/Eyck can", perhaps implying "as only I, van Eyck, can") was a common autograph for van Eyck. However this is his first known usage of the term, and it is unusually large and prominent. This and the sitter's unusually direct and confrontational gaze have been taken as an indication that the work is a self-portrait.

The panel is possibly the pendant to van Eyck's portrait of his wife in Bruges, although her portrait is dated 1439 and is larger. It has been proposed that he created his self-portrait to keep at his workshop so that he could use it to display his abilities (and social status, given the fine clothes evident in the portrait) to potential clients. However, in 1433, his reputation was such that he was already highly sought after for commissioned work and hardly needed to advertise.

The panel has been in the National Gallery, London, since 1851, where it hangs alongside his Arnolfini Portrait (1434) and Léal Souvenir (1432). The panel has been in England since its acquisition by Thomas Howard, 14th Earl of Arundel, probably during his exile in Antwerp from 1642 to 1644. (Note: It was noted in Arundel's collection in Antwerp by a Flemish visitor, as a portrait of the "Duke of Barlaumont".)

== Description ==
=== Portrait ===
The painting is small at one-third life-size. The sitter is shown in three-quarters profile. Like all van Eyck's portraits, it provides an unsparing, detailed analysis of the sitter. The man has pronounced stubble, and his face is heavily lined with the onset of middle age, most notably in the wrinkles that radiate outward from his eyes. His blue eyes are semi-bloodshot. His stubble is painted in brown and whitish-grey paint and his eyes with ultramarine. The figure is dressed in a dark purple and brown robe lined with brown fur at the neck. He looks directly at the viewer with a piercing and confident gaze.

His weary expression is achieved through a combination of his tightly pursed lips, wide mouth and the manner in which the headdress frames his face. The overall impression is of a man who, as one scholar says, "sees things—himself included—in close-up, but without losing track of the bigger picture". As is typical for van Eyck, the head is somewhat large in relation to the torso.

Examination using a microscope and infrared shows areas of underdrawing (preparatory sketches) on the contours of the nose and jawbone.

=== Headdress ===
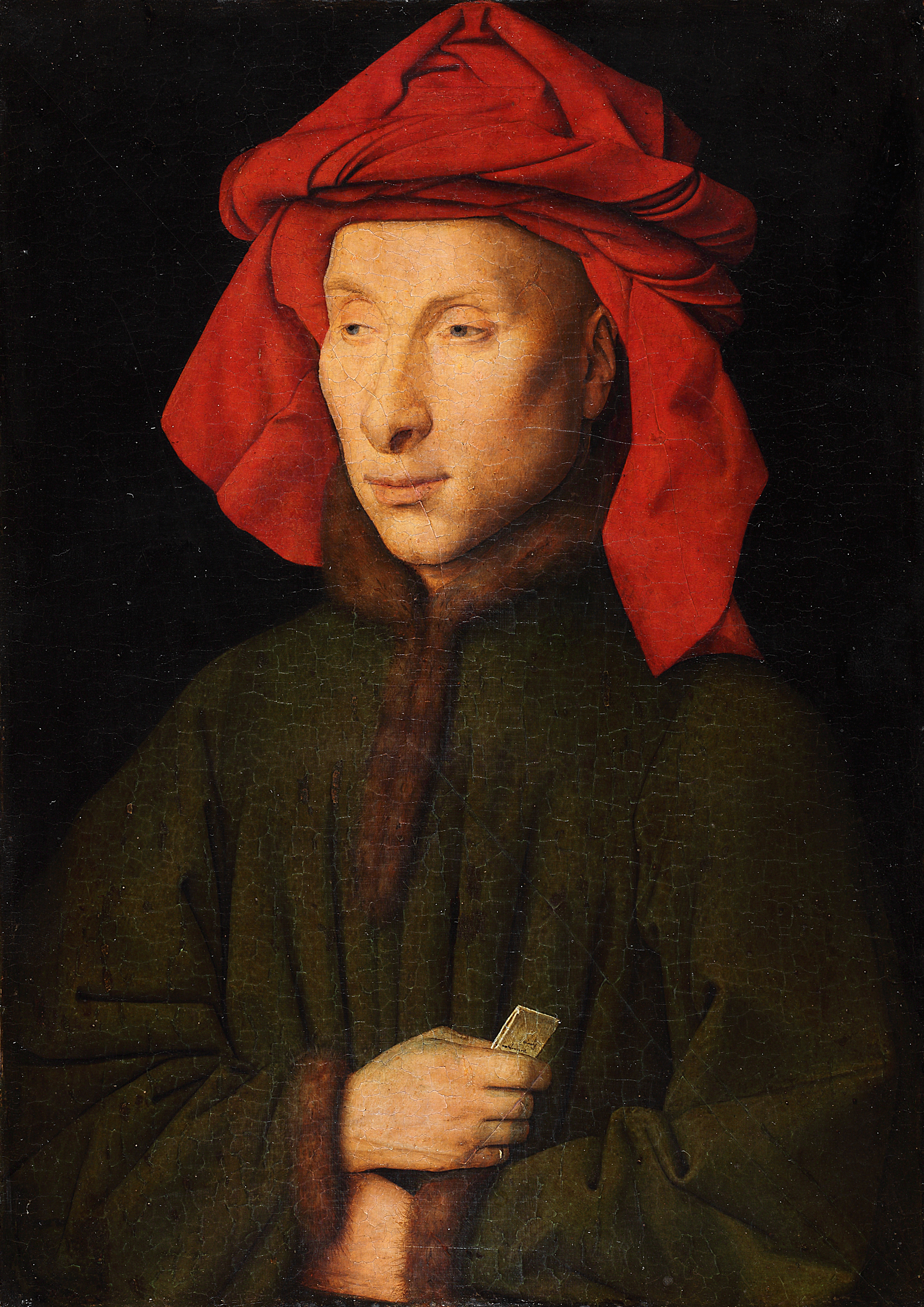
Van Eyck, Portrait of Giovanni di Nicolao Arnolfini, c. 1438

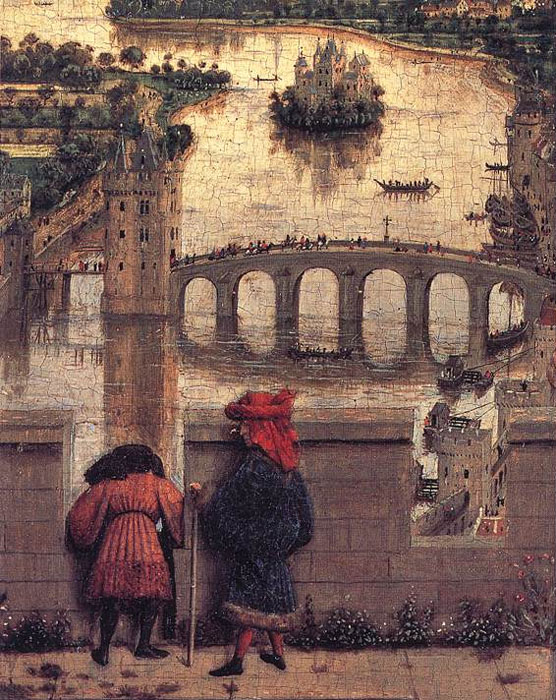
Detail from van Eyck's Madonna of Chancellor Rolin (1435), showing a figure in the distance wearing a similar red headdress

The unusually large headdress is painted in vermilion red and forms the centrepiece of the painting. The depiction of its lines and folds in such an elaborate fashion allowed the artist to display his confidence in his abilities. According to the critic Teju Cole, "each wrinkle of the cloth, each fold, each soft glimmer of light across the soft weave, is painted with the holy precision Jan van Eyck helped introduce to art".

However, the man is not, contrary to popular belief, wearing a turban, but rather a chaperon. The sash or cornette that would normally hang down is tied up over the top, giving it the look of a turban. Perhaps having the sash tied up would be a sensible precaution if it was worn while painting. According to the art historian Craig Harbison, the expensive cloth of the headdress is a further clue that the work is a self-portrait, as much like the gilded frame, it indicates wealth and bestows prestige on the sitter.

A similar chaperon is worn by a figure in the background of his 1435 Madonna of Chancellor Rolin and in the 1438 Portrait of Giovanni di Nicolao Arnolfini.

=== Frame and inscriptions ===
The painting in its frame

The frame is original and, unusually for the period, is gilded. It is approximately 7 cm wide at the top and end, and 7 cm wide at the sides. It is similar in style and construction to the frames of his Madrid Annunciation (c. 1434–1436), Portrait of Jan de Leeuw (1436), the centre panel of his Dresden Triptych (1437) and Madonna at the Fountain (1439). The side mouldings were carved with the grain. Those at the top and bottom ends of the panel are also with the grain, but were carved separately. The vertical sides are formed from the same piece of wood as the central panel.

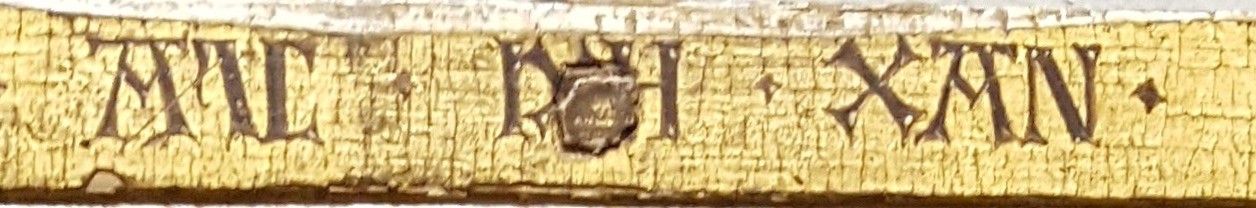
Detail of the inscription: "AΛΣ IXH XAN"

As with other van Eyck inscriptions, the lettering is painted onto the frame to appear carved. The inscriptions on the top of the frame use a Greek spelling, while the lower border uses Latin. The first-person motto "AΛΣ IXH XAN" ("ALS ICH XAN" or As I Can) appears in the center of the top border. Although Als Ich Xan is in Middle Dutch, the sounds are spelled with Greek letters. The inscription is painted in a combination of black, reddish-brown earths, white and yellow pigments. The words are a pun on van Eyck's name and appear on other paintings of his, always written in Greek letters, although not ever as large and prominent.

Art historians believe the motto is a challenge to other artists to try and do better. In addition, the Flemish phrase written in Greek script implies that van Eyck saw himself in "competition with the ancients as well as with his contemporaries". Regardless of his reasoning, it can be assumed that the phrase is a sign of van Eyck's self-confidence.

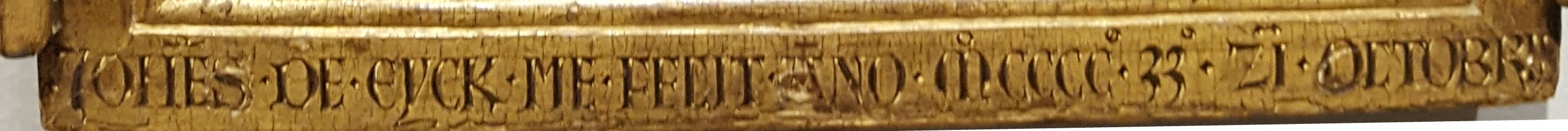
The inscriptions on the lower frame: "JOHES DE EYCK ME FECIT ANO MCCCC.33. 21. OCTOBRIS".

The words on the lower border are seemingly written in the painting's voice, reading "JOHES DE EYCK ME FECIT ANO MCCCC.33. 21. OCTOBRIS" ('Jan van Eyck made me on 21 October 1433'). Autographing and dating secular paintings in the early 15th century was unusual: typically they appear in religious donor portraits as, according to the art historian Alfred Acres, "testaments of devotion". When dates were added they tended to be the year of completion only, whereas here van Eyck spells out the specific date, 21 October 1433, which, as Campbell notes, was a Wednesday and Saint Ursula's feast day.

== Painting title ==
The idea of naming individual paintings did not exist in the early 15th century. Although it was widely known as Portrait of a Man in a Red Turban from the 18th century, most art historians and the holding National Gallery in London have used the title Portrait of a Man (Self Portrait?) since the mid–20th century, given the emergence that it is most likely in fact a stand alone self-portrait.

The National Gallery title is qualified with a question mark given that there is no extant documentary evidence that the painting is of the artist himself, and that no other independent self-portraits appear in European painting for several more decades. The idea that the work is a Van Eyck self-portrait first emerged in the 17th century, and subsequent research has led to the theory now being widely accepted. The main basis are the first-person inscriptions, the man's assertive and frontal gaze, its similarity to suspected self-portraits found inserted into larger identified paintings, and its possibly having been a pendant to his Portrait of Margaret van Eyck (his wife).

== Identity of the sitter ==
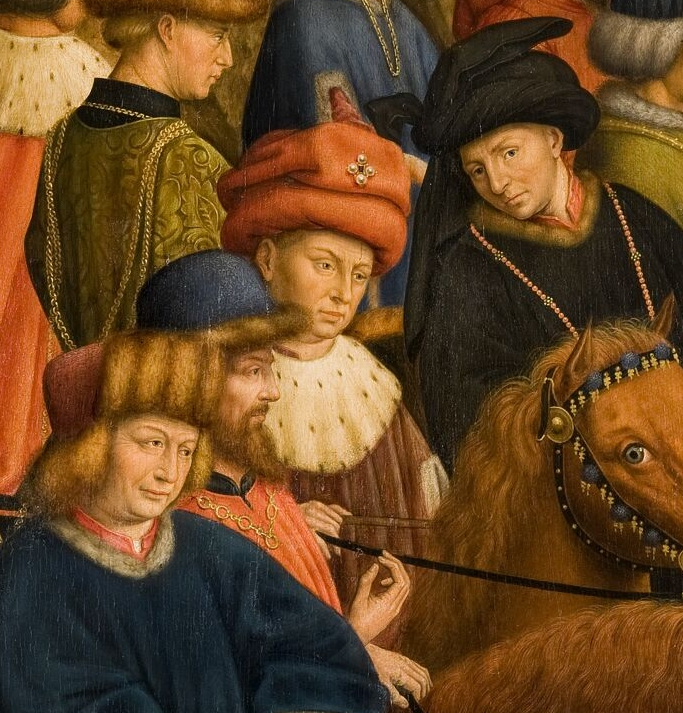
Detail from a copy of the "Just Judges", with the possible centre self portrait at centre.

The man's direct gaze may be the result of the artist studying himself in a mirror, a theory further reinforced by the fact that his hands (a feature van Eyck typically emphasised) are not shown. The costume is appropriate for a man of van Eyck's social position. The motto is his personal one, and otherwise only appears on two religious paintings, two lost paintings known from copies, and the portrait of his wife. In none of these is the motto as prominent as here, a primary reason why the work is usually considered a self-portrait.

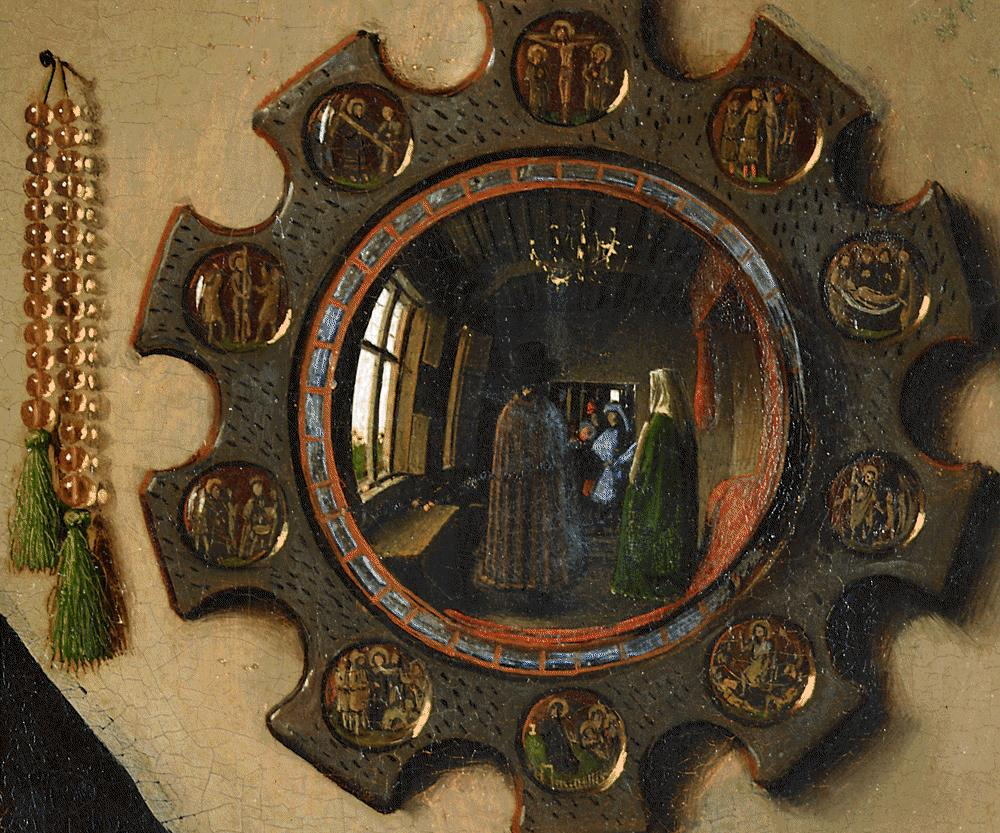
Reflection in the mirror of the Arnolfini Portrait

The emphasis on the sitter's sharp and intelligent but bloodshot eyes is a further but subtle clue, one found later in Albrecht Dürer's self-portrait of 1500. Some art historians view Van Eyck's portrait as a form of calling card for prospective clients, in which, in the words of the art historian Susie Nash, van Eyck is saying: "look at what I can do with paint, how lifelike I can make my figures".

Art historians have identified three other possible Van Eyck self-portraits: in the now lost "Just Judges" panel of the Ghent Altarpiece (completed c. 1432), in the miniature reflection on the armour in the Virgin and Child with Canon van der Paele (c. 1434—1436), and in the reflection in the mirror in the Arnolfini Portrait (1434). However the art historian Lorne Campbell, while recognising some facial similarity, considers the portraits on the van der Paele and Arnolfin panels to be "too small to give any indication of his appearance".

=== Relation to Portrait of Margaret van Eyck ===
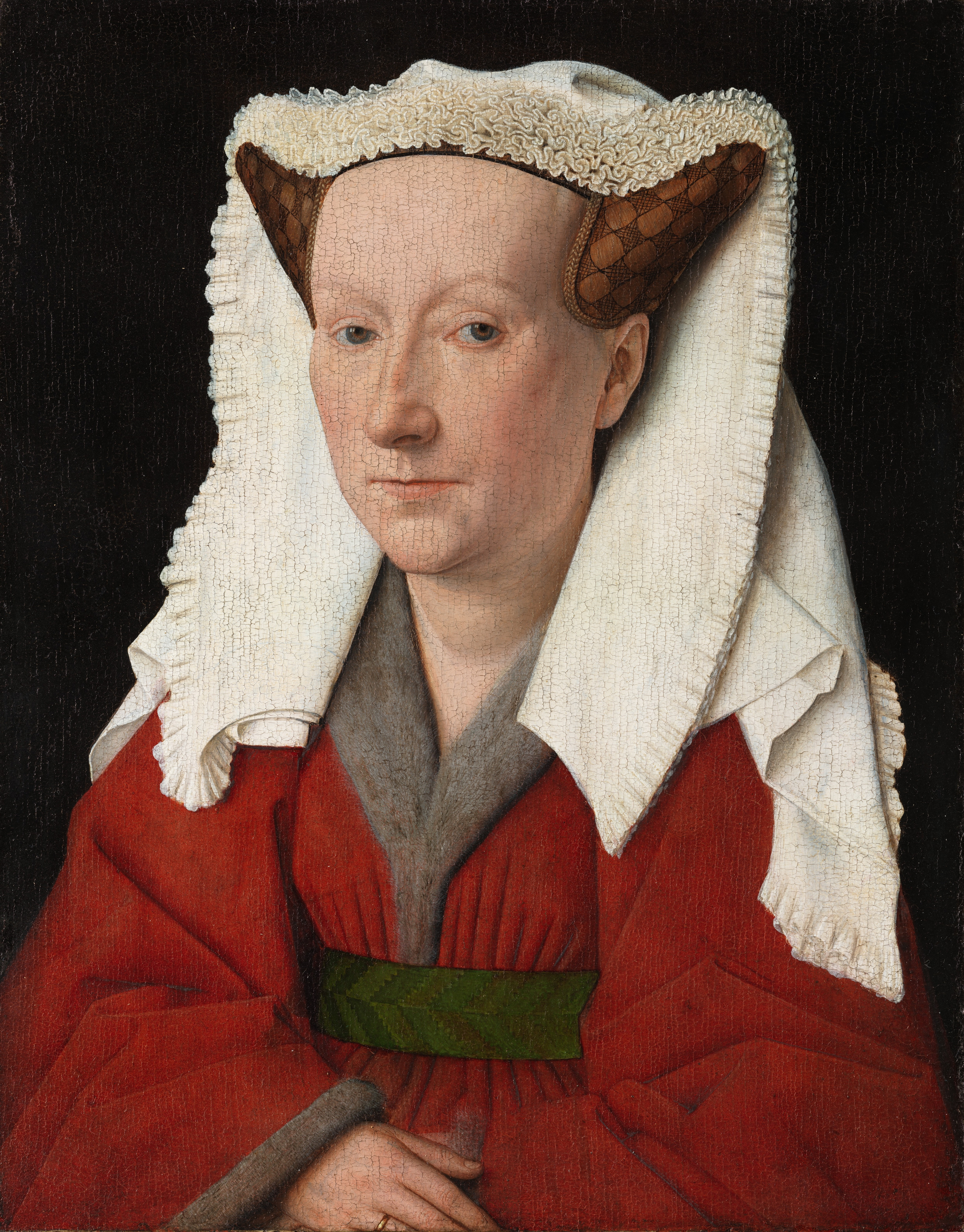
Portrait of Margaret van Eyck, 1439. Groeningemuseum, Bruges

Some earlier collectors and art historians speculated that the panel might once have formed half of a diptych with van Eyck's 1439 portrait of his wife Margaret, his only female portrait, which is also dominated by red hues (in this case a fur-lined red dress) and also shows an elaborate headdress. Both the portrait of Margaret and the male portrait in London were completed in Bruges, but there is no record of their commissions. It is thus believed that Margaret's portrait was created to mark a personal occasion in their relationship, and was intended to hang as a pendant of one of van Eyck's self-portraits.

However, it is not known which self-portrait was the original pendant to the portrait of Margaret, given that a number of candidates are known from records, but are now lost. Another possible candidate for the pendant self-portrait is that mentioned in inventory records when two of van Eyck's works were acquired before 1769 by the chapel of the Guild of Saint Luke. Some art historians, supporting the theory of a now lost diptych, mention a second lost potential self-portrait known to be similar in form to the painting in London.

== See also ==
- List of works by Jan van Eyck
