= Portrait of Margaret van Eyck =

1439 painting by Jan van Eyck

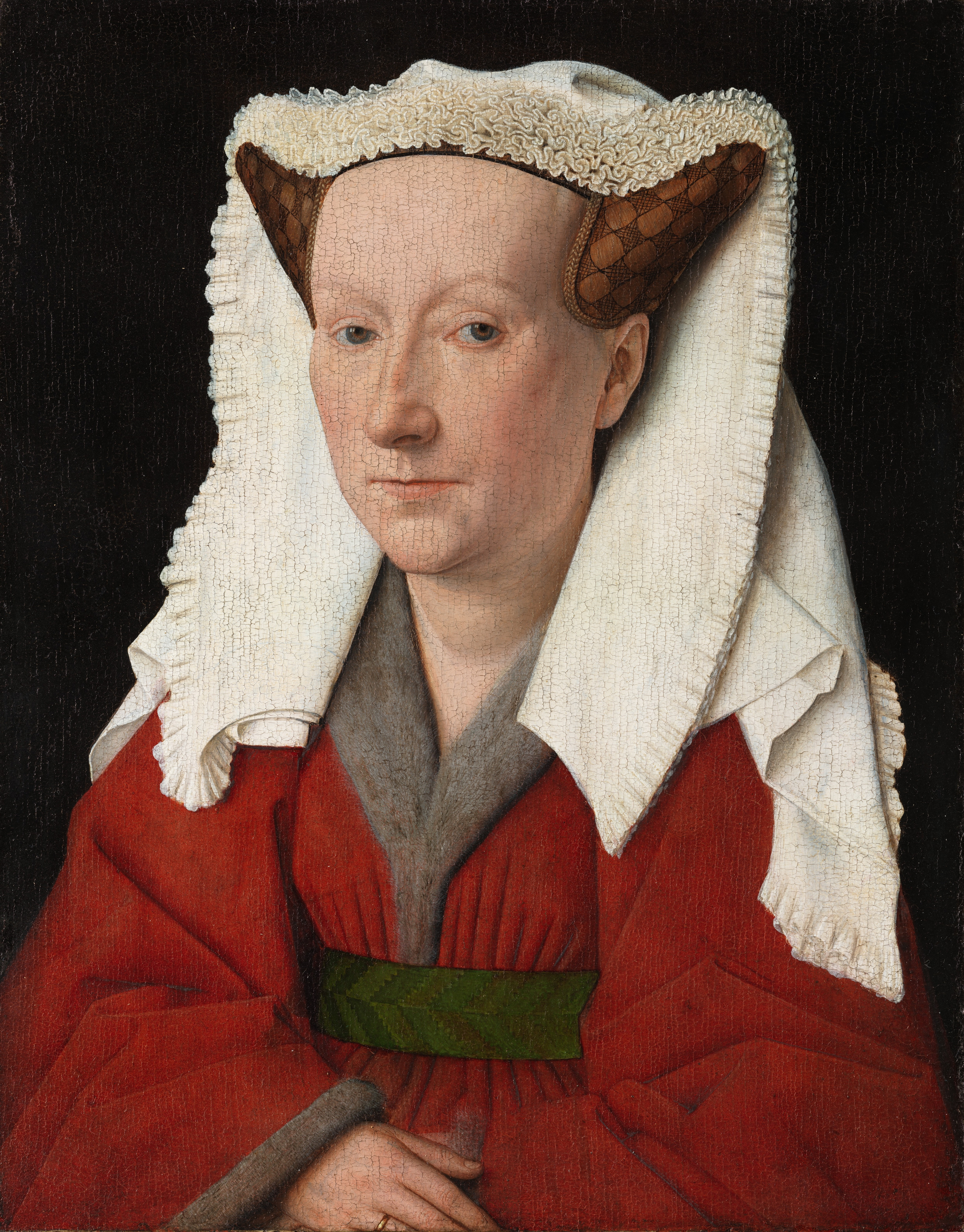
- Artist: Jan van Eyck
- Year: 1439
- Medium: Oil on oak panel
- Dimensions: 32.6 cm × 25.8 cm (12.8 in × 10.2 in)
- Location: Groeningemuseum, Bruges

Portrait of Margaret van Eyck (or Margaret, the Artist's Wife) is a 1439 oil on wood painting by the Early Netherlandish painter Jan van Eyck. It is one of the latest of his surviving paintings, and one of the earliest European artworks to depict a painter's spouse. The painting was made when she was around 34, and was hung until the early 18th century in the Bruges Chapel of the Guild of Painters. It is today in the Groeningemuseum in Bruges, Belgium.

Art historians believe it was once a pendant (diptych) panel for Jan's likely self-portrait in the National Gallery, London. The panel was in poor condition with cracks on the painted surface coupled with accumulated dirt causing discolour, until it was cleaned and restored in 1998 during its loan to the National Gallery, when it also received extensive technical examination.

== Description ==
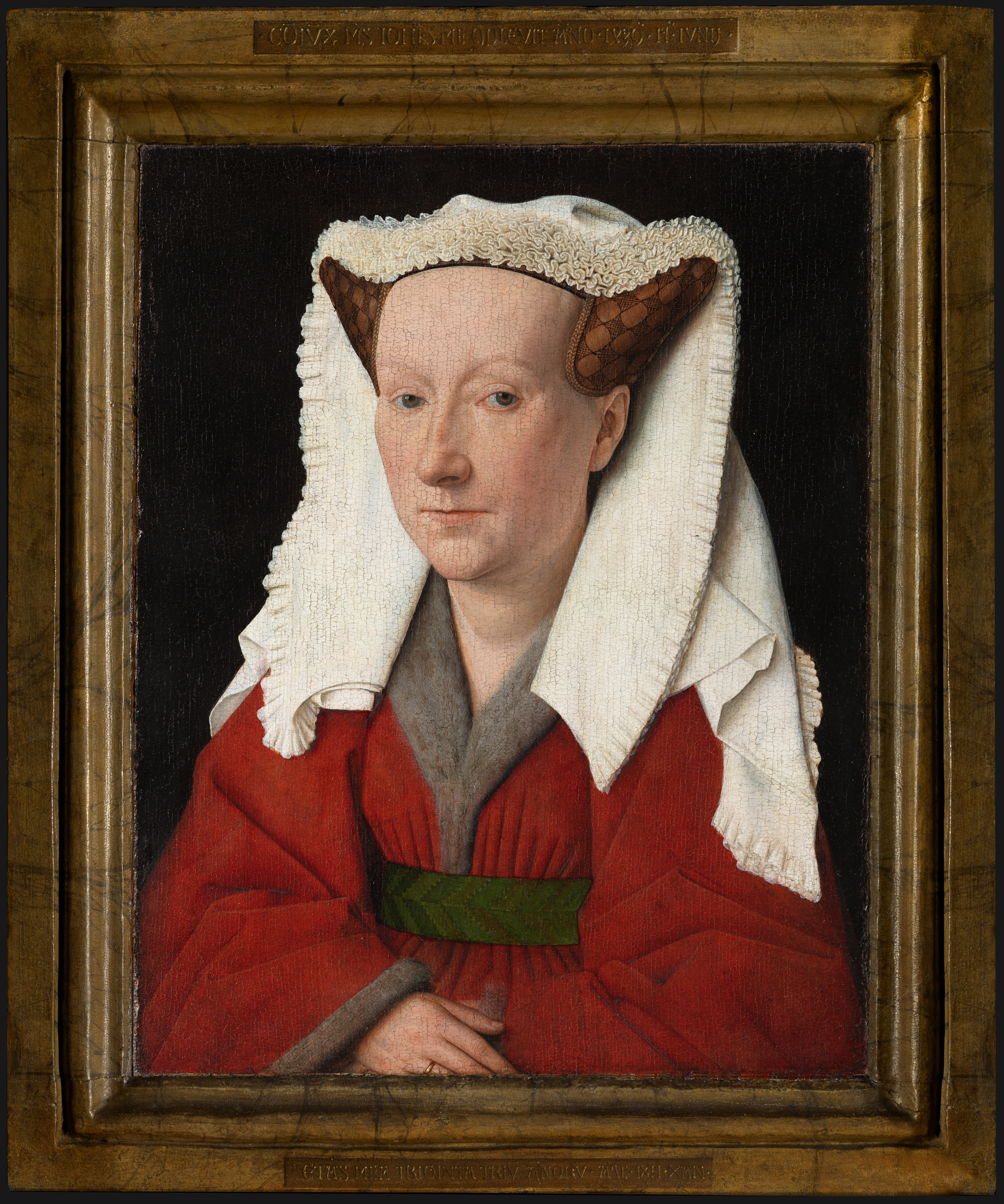
The painting in its frame

Margaret is shown in three-quarter view with her body almost directly facing the viewer, set against a black and featureless background. She wears an elegant red woolen gown with grey fur lining, probably from squirrel, in the neck and cuffs. Her white horned wimple is decorated with multiple layers of crimped linen. Her left eye shows evidence of a squint.

Jan has taken a number of liberties with representation to accentuate her features. As with his presumed self-portrait in London, her head is disproportionately large compared to her body, and her forehead is unusually and fashionably high, a device which allows the artist to concentrate on her facial features. The geometric pattern formed by her headdress, arms and the V of her neckline dominate the image.

Van Eyck died within two years of completing this work. He inscribed the plates on the top and end of the frame in Greek lettering CO[N]IV[N]X M[EV]S IOH[ANN]ES ME C[OM]PLEVIT AN[N]O . 1439°.17°IVNIJ and ETAS MEA TRIGINTA TRIV[M] AN[N]ORV[M] and Van Eyck's personal motto, A?C. IXH.XAN (My husband Johannes completed me in the year 1439 on 17 June, at the age of 33. As I can).

As I can" (ALS ICH KAN) was his personal motto and a pun on his surname. Similar words are inscribed on several of his religious paintings, and on two other portraits.

== Background ==
Portrait of a Man (Self Portrait?), 1433. National Gallery, London

The reasons for the painting's commissioning are unknown but appears that it was created for private rather than public viewing given the sitter's unidealised representation and her direct but plaintive gaze towards the viewer, which creates an intimate, informal atmosphere. It was probably intended to mark an occasion; maybe to commemorate the couple's anniversary, or her birthday.

Jan and Margaret likely married around 1432–33, soon after his move to Bruges - she is not mentioned before he relocated, and their first child is recorded as born in 1434. Very little is known of Margaret, even her maiden name is lost. The surviving contemporary records refer to her as Damoiselle Marguierite. She is thought to have been of aristocratic birth, though from the lower nobility, evidenced from her clothes in this portrait which are fashionable but not of the sumptuousness worn by the bride in van Eyck's Arnolfini Portrait. The fabrics and colours worn by people of the 15th century were informally regulated by their social position; for example, black, an expensive dye, could only be worn by the upper reaches of society. Although the widow of a renowned painter and diplomat, Margaret was only given a modest pension by the city of Bruges after Jan's death.

== Attribution ==
Although the Early Netherlandish painters are highly regarded today, they were almost forgotten by the early 1800s. This work was not rediscovered until the late 18th century when it was found for sale in a Belgian fish market, although accounts differ. As with most of the rediscovered works of its era, it underwent a number of attributions before a broad consensus on its origin was formed. The portrait is still in its original frame and is in very good condition with the colours and paint well preserved. It was cleaned and restored by the National Gallery (NG), London in 1998.

Many early collectors and later art historians speculated that it might have once formed half of a diptych. It was paired as a pendant for a time with a self-portrait by van Eyck when two of his works were acquired before 1769 by the chapel of the Guild of Saint Luke. Some art historians supporting the theory of a diptych, mention a now-lost male portrait known to be similar to his NG Portrait of a Man (Self Portrait?) A third painting is suspected, but not known, to be a portrait of Margaret: the 1436 Lucca Madonna. However, the art historian Max Friedländer warned against assumptions of identity based on facial resemblance on figures in different works, believing that artists of the time may have projected the likeness of the women in their lives onto the depictions of other female subjects.

== See also ==
- List of works by Jan van Eyck

== Sources ==
- Benton, Janetta Rebold. "Materials, Methods, and Masterpieces of Medieval Art". Praeger, 2009. ISBN 0-275-99418-X
- Borchert, Till-Holger. "Margaret van Eyck", in Van Eyck to Durer. London: Thames & Hudson, 2011. ISBN 978-0-500-23883-7
- Campbell, Lorne. The Fifteenth-Century Netherlandish Paintings. London: National Gallery, 1998. ISBN 0-300-07701-7
- Chipps Smith, Jeffrey. The Northern Renaissance, Phaidon Press, 2004. ISBN 978-0-7148-3867-0
- Ferrari, Simone. Van Eyck: Masters of Art. Munich: Prestel, 2013. ISBN 978-3-7913-4826-1
- Harbison, Craig. Jan van Eyck: The Play of Realism. Reaktion Books, 1997. ISBN 0-948462-79-5
- Smith, Jeffrey Chipps. The Northern Renaissance. London: Phaidon Press, 2004. ISBN 0-7148-3867-5
- Van Der Elst, Joseph. The Last Flowering of the Middle Ages. Kessinger Publishing, 2005. ISBN 1-4191-3806-5
- Van Buren, Anne. Illuminating Fashion: Dress in the Art of Medieval France and the Netherlands, 1325-1515. New York: Morgan Library & Museum, 2011. ISBN 978-1-9048-3290-4
