= Giovanni Arnolfini =

Italian merchant

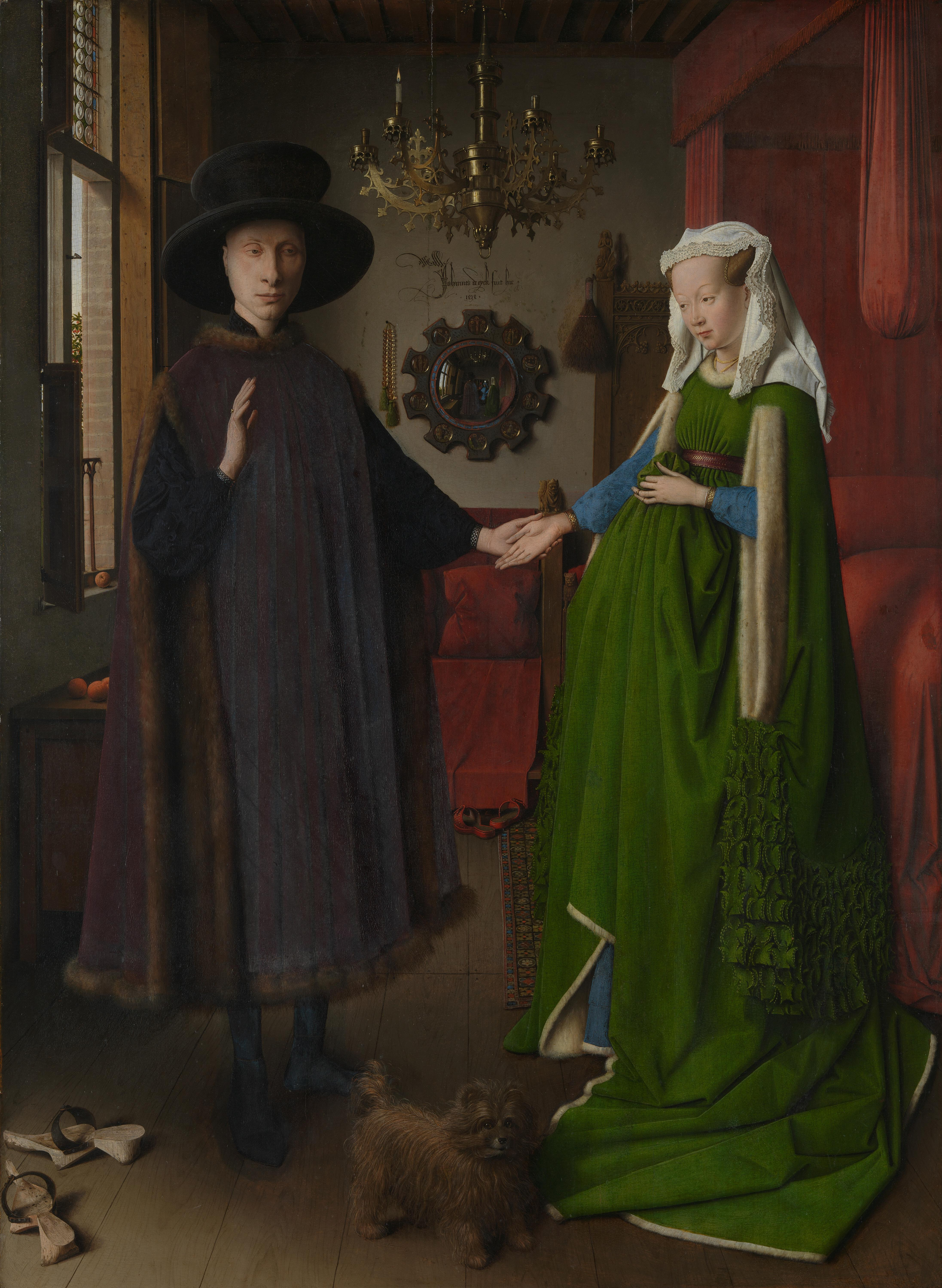
Arnolfini Portrait, or Portrait of Giovanni Arnolfini and his Wife by Jan van Eyck, 1434

Giovanni di Nicolao Arnolfini (c. 1400 – after 1452) was an Italian merchant from Lucca, a city in Tuscany, Italy. He spent most of his life in Flanders, then part of the Duchy of Burgundy, probably always based in Bruges, a wealthy trading city and one of the main towns of the Burgundian court. The Arnolfini were a powerful family in Lucca, involved in the politics and trade of the small but wealthy city, which specialised (like Florence) in weaving expensive cloth.

== Life ==
Giovanni, known as di Nicolao or "son of Nicolao" to distinguish him from his cousin Giovanni di Arrigo Arnolfini (see below), moved to Bruges in Flanders at an early age to work in the family business and lived there for the rest of his life. He became wealthy trading in silk and other fabrics, tapestries and other precious objects, although in later years he seems to have suffered business reverses, and to have retired from trading. His fame arises because he is the most likely candidate, out of a number of male Arnolfinis, to have been the subject of two portraits by Jan van Eyck, the famous Flemish painter. These are The Arnolfini Portrait of Giovanni and his wife, dated 1434 and now in London; and another portrait, evidently of the same sitter when slightly older, now in Berlin (below).

He was presumably born in Lucca, where his parents lived, but neither the place nor the date are documented. He was sent to Bruges while still technically a child, as the first record of him is a letter from his father Nicolao in Lucca to his agent in Bruges in 1419 empowering the agent to "emancipate" Giovanni – that is, to declare him adult. Since there was no fixed age for this, it gives no real clue as to his date of birth.

In the next few years, Giovanni di Nicolao worked with a very successful Italian merchant, Marco Guidiccioni, another Lucchese who was connected to him by marriage. Records of some of his dealings with the Ducal court have survived, but these were probably only part of his business activities. In 1422 he tried to sell a valuable gold collar to King Henry V of England, and in 1423 he sold Duke Phillip the Good six tapestries of scenes from the Life of the Virgin, which the Duke gave to the Pope. Other sales to the Court are recorded, although he may have been acting on behalf of Guidiccioni.

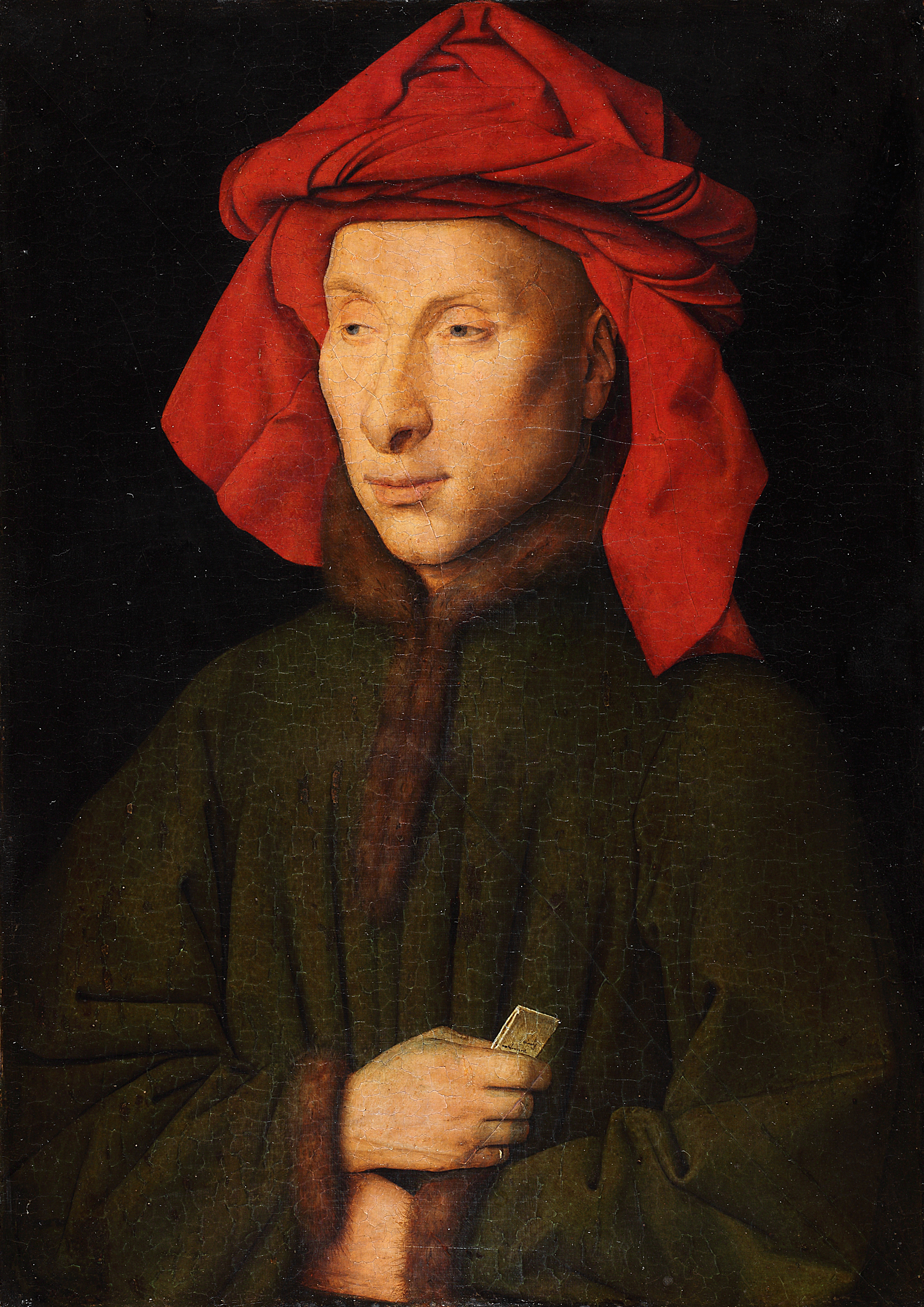
Jan van Eyck, Portrait of Giovanni di Nicolao Arnolfini. Gemäldegalerie, Berlin

In 1426 he married Costanza Trenta, who is at first sight not the wife in the portrait, as a letter by her mother of 26 February 1433 mentions that she had died. She was also from Lucca, and her aunt Ginevra Cavalcanti was married to Lorenzo de' Medici, brother of Cosimo de' Medici. On the other hand, Margaret Koster has recently proposed that the double portrait may be a memorial one, including an image of Costanza, but painted a year after her death.

In 1442 he signed an agreement whereby, for a moderate fee, he became a burgess of Bruges after promising not to trade as a merchant. He was permitted to practise "the small burgess's crafts", but whether he ever did is unknown. In 1446 and 1452 he is documented as an arbitrator in disputes between other Lucchese merchants (in 1446 including his cousin Giovanni) over property; these are his last appearances in the documentary record. The double portrait remained in Flanders (see the Provenance section in that article), which suggests that Giovanni died there. He was referred to as Hernoul-le-Fin in the first inventory record of the double portrait.

A slightly younger first cousin of Giovanni called Giovanni de Arrigo Arnolfini (or "Jehan Arnoulphin le jeune" by the Burgundian accountants), also came to live in Bruges and was even more successful than Giovanni de Nicolao. Giovanni de Arrigo Arnolfini married, and was survived by, Giovanna (Jeanne) Cenami, and they were the couple thought to be the shown in the Arnolfini Portrait from 1861 until 1994, when a French naval historian, Jacques Paviot, discovered in the Ducal accounts that the Duke had in 1447 presented two silver pots to "Jehan Arnoulphin" on his marriage – by this time Van Eyck had been dead for six years. Jane or Jeanne Arnolfini is documented further until her death in Bruges in 1480. A further two Arnolfinis, each a younger brother of one of the two Giovannis, are possible candidates as the subject of the Van Eyck portraits, as they lived in, or passed through, Bruges; but neither was apparently there in 1434.
