= Craig Harbison =

American art historian

Craig Stephen Harbison (April 19, 1944 – May 17, 2018) was an American art historian specialising in 15th and 16th-century Flemish and Northern Renaissance painting. He was Professor Emeritus of Art History at the University of Massachusetts Amherst. While attending Princeton University in the early 1970s, he studied iconographic analysis under Erwin Panofsky and Wolfgang Stechow. He had previously studied at Oberlin College, Ohio.

While Panofsky was a large influence early in Harbison's career, and he described himself as once being "sort of a rebellious Panofsky-ite", he moved away from pure study of iconography toward placing the paintings in the context of the social history of their time. He said, "Social history was becoming increasingly important. Panofsky had never really talked about what kind of people these were. I went after the people in all of these van Eyck paintings, researched about patrons."

Harbison published a number of books on the Northern Renaissance and wrote extensively for such publications as Art Quarterly, The Art Bulletin, Renaissance Quarterly and Simiolus. He wrote extensively on Jan van Eyck, especially the painter's Arnolfini Portrait.

== Publications ==
- The Last Judgment in Sixteenth Century Northern Europe, A Study in the Relation between Art and the Reformation. New York: Garland, 1975. ISBN 0-8240-1988-1
- Religious imagination and art- historical method: a reply to Barbara Lane's 'Sacred versus profane'. "Simiolus: Netherlands Quarterly for the History of Art" 19, 3 (1989), 198- 205.
- Jan van Eyck, the Play of Realism. London: Reaktion Books, 1991. ISBN 0-948462-79-5
- The Mirror of the Artist: Northern Renaissance Art in its Historical Context. New York: Abrams, 1995. ISBN 0-13-368549-7
- The Art of the Northern Renaissance. London: Weidenfeld & Nicolson, 1995. ISBN 0297835122
