= List of works by Jan van Eyck =

This is a complete list of the paintings, drawings and illuminated miniatures attributed to the Early Netherlandish artist Jan van Eyck. Only some twenty paintings are currently attributed to him; a great many others are assumed to be either lost or destroyed.

Van Eyck was the first major European artist to utilise oil painting. Although the use of oil paint preceded Van Eyck by many centuries, his virtuosic handling and manipulation and use of multiple half-transparent layers of paint, glazes, wet-on-wet and other techniques was such that Giorgio Vasari started the myth that Van Eyck had invented oil painting.

About twenty surviving paintings are confidently attributed to him, as well as the Ghent Altarpiece (co-attributed to his brother Hubert) and some of the illuminated miniatures of the Turin-Milan Hours. All panels are dated between 1432 and 1439. Ten works are dated and signed with a variation of his motto ALS ICH KAN ("As I can").

== Paintings ==
| Image | Title | Date | Current location | Dimensions | Signatures or inscriptions |
|---|---|---|---|---|---|
| | Ghent Altarpiece | c. 1420-32 | St Bavo's Cathedral, Ghent | 3.4 m × 5.2 m, open view 3.4 m × 2.23 m, closed view | Chronogram, poetry in Latin. Found in 1832. Possibly not original, post-mortem (2nd half of 16th century): Pictor Hubertus e Eyck. maior que nemo repertus Incepit . pondus . q[ue] Johannes arte secundus [Frater] perfecit. Judoci Vijd prece fretus VersU seXta MaI . Vos CoLLoCat aCta tUerI (The painter Hubert van Eyck, greater than whom no one was found, began this work. His brother Jan, second in art, having completed this difficult task at the request of Joos Vijd, invites you by this verse to see the result on 6 May [1432]). Number 1432 is taken from chronogram. |
| | Portrait of a Man with a Blue Chaperon | c. 1430 | Brukenthal National Museum, Sibiu | 22.5 cm × 16.6 cm | The painting is not signed or dated by van Eyck. Bears an imitation of the "AD" and date 1490 by an unknown hand. |
| | Saint Francis Receiving the Stigmata | c. 1430-32 | Sabauda Gallery, Turin | 29.3 cm × 33.4 cm | |
| | Saint Francis Receiving the Stigmata | 1430-32 | Philadelphia Museum of Art | 12.7 cm × 14.6 cm | |
| | Crucifixion and Last Judgement | c. 1430-40 | Metropolitan Museum of Art, New York City | 56.5 cm × 19.5 cm each | Not signed. |
| | Portrait of Cardinal Niccolò Albergati | c. 1431 | Kunsthistorisches Museum, Vienna | 34 cm × 29.5 cm | |
| | Léal Souvenir | 1432 | National Gallery, London | 33.3 cm × 18.9 cm | On the parapet, imitation of carving, using Greek letters (with errors), and in Latin: TYΜ.ωΘΕΟϹ; LEAL SOVVENIR; ACTU[M] AN[N]O D[OMI]NI.1432.10. DIE OCTOBRIS.A.IOH[ANNE] DE EYCK (Timotheos; Loyal Remembrance, or Faithful Souvenir; Finished in the year of our Lord 1432 on the 10th day of October by Jan van Eyck) |
| | Portrait of a Man (Self Portrait?) | 1433 | National Gallery, London | 25.5 cm × 19 cm | Imitation of carving on the top of the original frame in Middle Dutch but using pseudo-Greek letters: AΛΣ IXH XAN (as I can); On the lower frame in Latin: JOHES DE EYCK ME FECIT ANO MCCCC.33. 21. OCTOBRIS (Jan van Eyck made me on 21 October 1433) |
| | Arnolfini Portrait | 1434 | National Gallery, London | 82 cm × 59.5 cm | On the wall above the mirror in Latin: JOHANNES DE EYCK FUIT HIC 1434 (Jan van Eyck was here 1434) |
| | Annunciation | 1434-36 | National Gallery of Art, Washington, D.C. | 90.2 cm × 34.1 cm | |
| | Annunciation | 1434-36 | Thyssen-Bornemisza Museum, Madrid | 39 cm × 24 cm | |
| | Portrait of Baudouin de Lannoy | 1435 | Gemäldegalerie, Berlin | 26 cm × 20 cm | |
| | Madonna of Chancellor Rolin | 1435 | Louvre, Paris | 66 cm × 62 cm | Old descriptions tell that the painting originally had a wooden frame painted illusionistically with inscriptions seemingly carved. Possibly with signature. |
| | Portrait of Jan de Leeuw | 1436 | Kunsthistorisches Museum, Vienna | 24.5 cm × 19 cm | The panel's borders with painted letters in the Flemish vernacular. The numerals are rendered in Arabic: IAN DE {LEEUW} OP SANT ORSELEN DACH / DAT CLAER EERST MET OGHEN SACH, 1401; GHECONTERFEIT NV HEEFT MI IAN; VAN EYCK WEL BLIICT WANNEERT BEGA(N) 1436 (Jan De [Leeuw], who First Opened His Eyes on the Feast of St Ursula [21 October], 1401. Now Jan Van Eyck Has Painted Me, You Can See When He Began it. 1436). The word "Leeuw" is substituted for a pictogram of a lion (sitter's surname in Dutch). The inscription seems to contain three chronograms (the year of completion, the year of the sitter's birth and his age). |
| | Virgin and Child with Canon van der Paele | 1436 | Groeningemuseum, Bruges | 1.22 m × 1.57 m | Lower border of the frame: HOC OP ' FECIT MAGR GEORGI' DE PALA HUI' CANONI P IOHANNE DE EYCK PICTORE. ET FUNDAVIT HIC DUAS CAPELLIAS DE I GMO CHORI DOMINI . M . CCCC . XXXIIIJ . PL AU . 1436 (Master Joris van der Paele, canon of this church, commissioned this work from the artist Jan van Eyck and founded two chaplaincies, located in the choir, in 1434. However, he completed it in 1436) |
| | Dresden Triptych | 1437 | Gemäldegalerie Alte Meister, Dresden | 33 cm × 27.5 cm | Found after 1959 during restauration n the inner moulding of the central frame in front of the tiled floor: JOHANNES DE EYCK ME FECIT ET CÓ(M)PLEVIT ANNO DOMINI MCCCCXXXVII (1437). ALC IXH XAN |
| | Lucca Madonna | c. 1437 | Städel Museum, Frankfurt | 65.7 cm × 49.6 cm | |
| | Portrait of Giovanni di Nicolao Arnolfini | 1438 | Gemäldegalerie, Berlin | 29 cm × 20 cm | Original frame lost, possibly considered signature. |
| | Madonna in the Church | c. 1438-40 | Gemäldegalerie, Berlin | 31 cm × 14 cm | Was stolen in 1877 and soon returned, but without its original inscribed frame, which was never recovered. |
| | Portrait of Margaret van Eyck | 1439 | Groeningemuseum, Bruges | 41.2 cm × 34.6 cm | On the top and bottom parts of the frame: CO[N]IV[N]X M[EV]S IOH[ANN]ES ME C[OM]PLEVIT AN[N]O . 1439°.17°IVNIJ; ETAS MEA TRIGINTA TRIV[M] AN[N]ORV[M] AΛC. IXH.XAN (My husband Johannes completed me in the year 1439 on 17 June, at the age of 33. As I can) |
| | Madonna at the Fountain | 1439 | Royal Museum of Fine Arts Antwerp | 19 cm × 12 cm | On the frame: ALS IXH CAN; JOHES DE EYCK ME FECIT + [COM]PLEVIT ANNO 1439 |
| | Madonna of Jan Vos | 1441-43 | Frick Collection, New York City | 47.3 cm × 61.3 cm | |

== Illuminated manuscripts ==
| Image | Title | Date | Current location | Notes |
|---|---|---|---|---|
| | Turin-Milan Hours | c. 1420 | Turin City Museum of Ancient Art | The miniatures done by Hand "G", of which three survive are generally believed to be by either Jan van Eyck or his brother Hubert |

== Drawings ==
| Image | Title | Date | Current location | Dimensions |
|---|---|---|---|---|
| | Study for Cardinal Niccolò Albergati | c. 1432 | Kupferstich-Kabinett, Dresden | 21.4 cm × 18 cm |
| | Saint Barbara | 1437 | Royal Museum of Fine Arts Antwerp | 34 cm × 18.5 cm (signed on the frame JOH(ANN)ES DE EYCK ME FECIT 1437) |
| | Crucifixion | c. 1440 | Museum Boijmans van Beuningen, Rotterdam | 25.4 cm × 18.7 cm |

== Lost works ==
| Image | Title | Date | Notes |
|---|---|---|---|
| | Portrait of Isabella of Portugal | c.1428-29 | Known only from copies |
| | Saint Christopher | Unknown | Known through two copies: a painting held at the Philadelphia Museum of Art and a drawing held by the Louvre |
| | Woman Bathing | c. 1434 | Known through two copies: one at Antwerp and one in the Harvard Art Museums |
| | Vera Icon | before 1438 | Known from three contemporary workshop copies |
| | Madonna of Nicolas van Maelbeke | after 1440 | Known from an 18th-century replica and several contemporary silverpoint drawings |

== Contested ==
| Image | Title | Date | Current location | Dimensions | Notes |
|---|---|---|---|---|---|
| | The Three Marys at the Tomb | c. 1410-26 | Museum Boijmans Van Beuningen, Rotterdam | 71.5 cm × 90 cm | Now usually attributed to Hubert van Eyck |
| | The Fountain of Life | c. 1432 | Museo del Prado, Madrid | 181 cm c 119 cm | Usually attributed to the workshop of Van Eyck |
| | Portrait of a Man with Carnation | c. 1436 | Gemäldegalerie, Berlin | 40 cm × 31 cm | Attributed to Van Eyck or a member of his workshop |

== Workshop ==
| Image | Title | Current location | Dimensions |
|---|---|---|---|
| | Crucifixion (after van Eyck?) | Ca' d'Oro, Venice | 46 cm × 31 cm |
| | Ince Hall Madonna (Virgin and Child Reading) | National Gallery of Victoria, Melbourne | 26.5 x 19.5 |
| | Christ on the Cross with the Virgin and Saint John | Gemäldegalerie, Berlin | 43 cm × 26 cm |
| | Saint Jerome in his Study | Detroit Institute of Arts | 20.6 x 13.3 |

== Sources ==
- Acres, Alfred. "Jan van Eyck: within His Art". London: Reaktion Books, 2013. ISBN 978-1-7891-4761-2
- Borchert, Till-Holger. Van Eyck. London: Taschen, 2008. ISBN 3-8228-5687-8
