= Vera Icon (van Eyck) =

Lost painting by Jan van Eyck

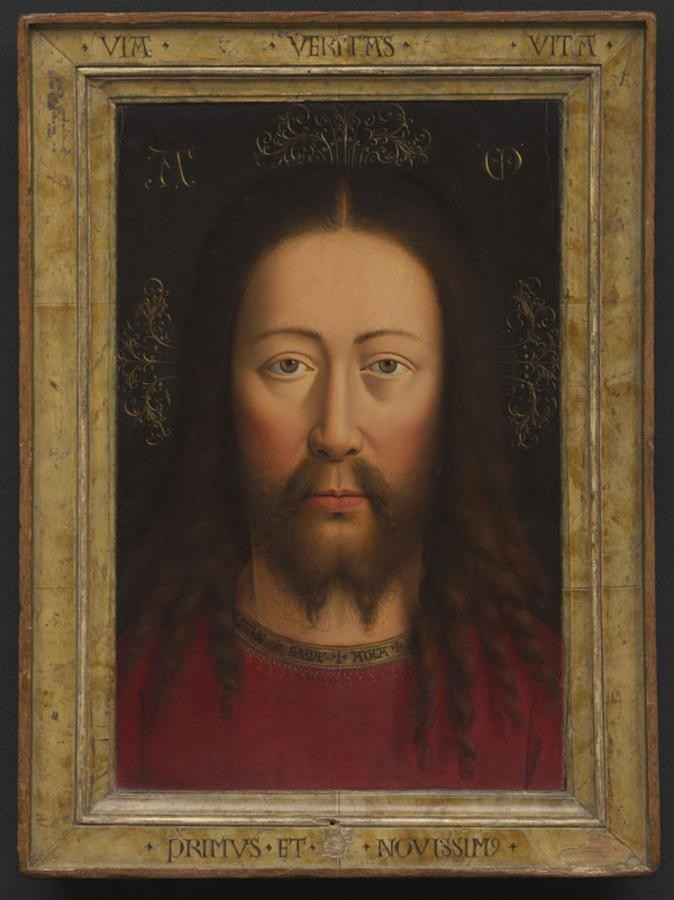
Copy after van Eyck; Vera Icon, Oil on oak, 50cm x 37cm, 1439. Until 1817 in the Basilica of Saint Servatius in Maastricht; since 1827 in the Alte Pinakothek, Munich

Vera Icon (or Head of Christ) is a lost oil-on panel portrait by the Early Netherlandish painter Jan van Eyck, which probably formed half of a since-dismantled diptych. The original is known through three contemporary copies from his workshop. They were completed in 1438, 1439 and 1440; with the first and last in Bruges, and the 1439 version in Munich.

From these reproductions, we can deduce its small scale, and that the panel evidenced the master's usual unflinching approach to physiognomy. Of its origin or commission we know nothing. Unusually he presents an idealised and straightforward iconographic image of Christ. Although emotive, the panel follows a very traditional presentation of Christ in the hieratical manner, facing directly out of the space. The usual title, Vera Icon, refers to the Eastern tradition of icons in the "Without Hands" convention. Each of the canonical extant copies has a form of signature by van Eyck. The Berlin inscription reads "Johes de eyck me fecit et applevit anno 1438 3I Januarij". The version in Bruges reads: "Johes de eyck . . anno 1420 30 January".

And yet it differs in two manners from representation of the late 14th and early 15th centuries; in its physiological exactness, and illusionistic frames. Like many of his surviving works, the panel contains a heavily inscribed fictive frame painted around the portrait. In each contemporary copy, the background is composed from dark greens, and Christ is dressed in crimson robes, and has long, dark hair. The lettering on the neckline of his gown reads "REX REGNUM", a phrase that appears on the garment worn by God in the Ghent Altarpiece.

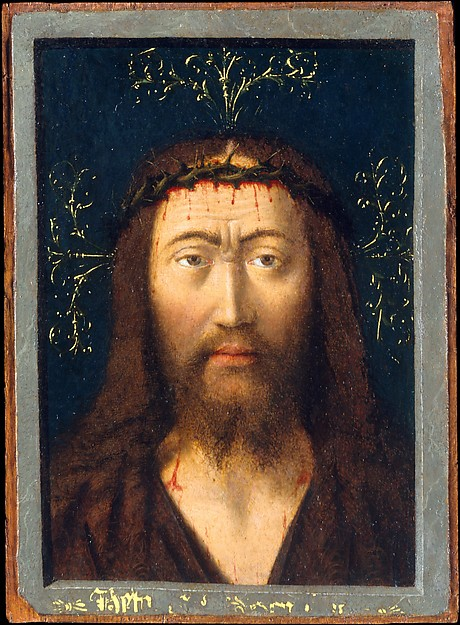
Head of Christ, Petrus Christus, c. 1444 Metropolitan Museum of Art, New York

The model for the depiction comes from text rather than painting. It is thought that van Eyck drew from Ludolph of Saxony's 14th-century "Life of Christ", and that description of a Christ as having a "reverend countenance which they that look upon may love an fear; having the hair of the hue of an unripe hazelnut...parting at the middle of the head according to the fashion of the Nazareans...; having a full beard of the colour of his hair, not long, but a little forked at the chin."

Petrus Christus' 1444-45 Head of Christ, now in the Metropolitan Museum of Art in New York, derives from van Eyck's panel, but is less traditional and more emotive; evidenced by the crown of thorns, and drips of blood running from the forehead to chest. The specific van Eyckian direct but plaintive expression and deep colour schemes were adopted by the Bruges Master of the Legend of St. Ursula for a number of his Veil of Veronica portraits.

The New York painting is in relatively good condition given its age. There are marks of retouching around the hair, but otherwise the paint is intact.

== See also ==
- List of works by Jan van Eyck

== Sources ==
- Ainsworth, Maryan Wynn. From Van Eyck to Bruegel: Early Netherlandish Paintings in the Metropolitan Museum of Art. NY: Metropolitan Museum of Art, 2009. ISBN 0-8709-9870-6
- Borchert, Till-Holger. Van Eyck. London: Taschen, 2008. ISBN 3-8228-5687-8
- Conway, Martin. "A Head of Christ by John van Eyck". The Burlington Magazine for Connoisseurs, Volume 39, No. 225, December 1921
- Harbison, Craig. Jan van Eyck, The Play of Realism. London: Reaktion Books, 1991. ISBN 0-948462-18-3
