= Portrait of a Man with Carnation =

15th-century painting

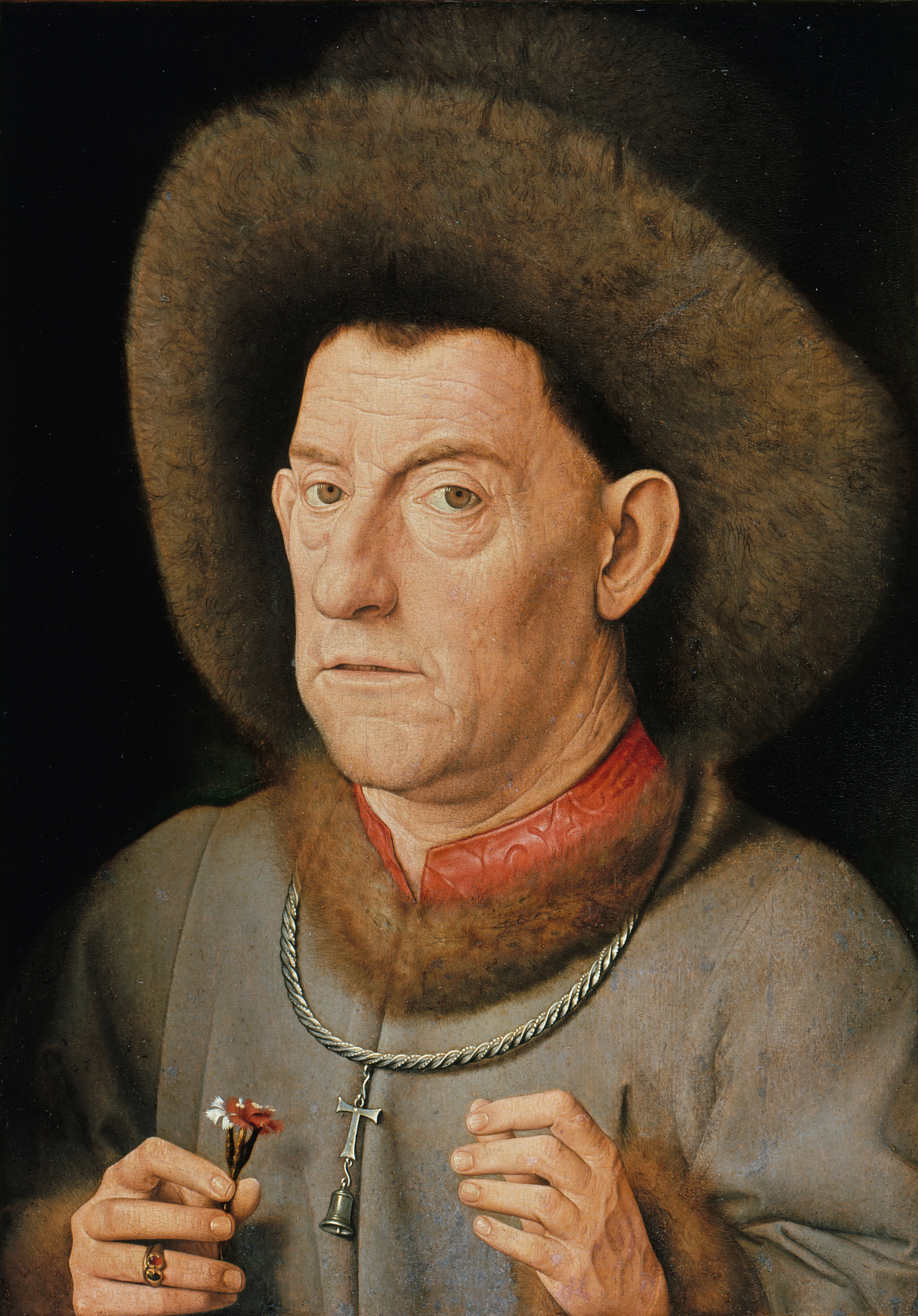
Portrait of a Man with Carnation, 40 x 31cm, c. 1436. Gemaldegalerie, Berlin

Portrait of a Man with Carnation is a small oil on oakwood painting usually attributed to the Early Netherlandish master Jan van Eyck or a member of his workshop. Based on dendrochronological examination of the wood, it is thought to have been completed relatively late in van Eyck's career, perhaps around 1436. It is now in the Gemäldegalerie, Berlin. The sitter wears grey clothes and a large grey hat which is fur-lined at the neck. holds a small bouquet of carnations, symbols of love and marriage. He has not been identified, but wears the medal of the Order of Saint Anthony, established by Albert I, Duke of Bavaria. The man is older, probably in his early 50s, and has a coarse, rough look.

== Sources ==
- Ammann, Ruth. In The Enchantment of Gardens: A Psychological Approach. Daimon Verlag, 2009. ISBN 3-8563-0724-9
- Giltay, J. Review of "Hubert and Jan van Eyck" by Elisabeth Dhanens. Simiolus: Netherlands Quarterly for the History of Art, Volume 13, No. 1, 1983
- Borchert, Till-Holger. Van Eyck. London: Taschen, 2008. ISBN 3-8228-5687-8
