= Christ on the Cross with the Virgin and Saint John =

Painting attributed to the workshop of Jan van Eyck

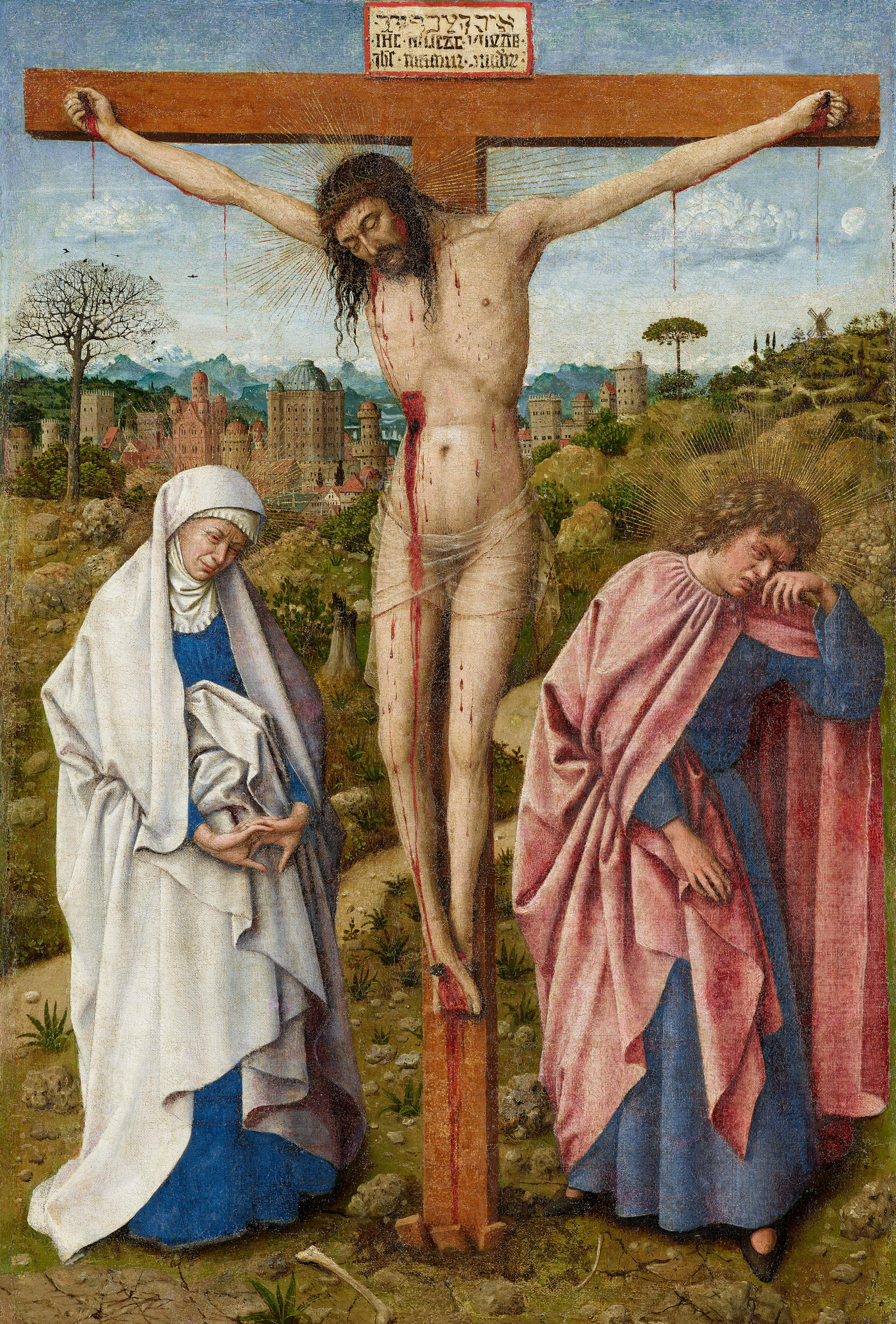
Christ on the Cross with the Virgin and Saint John, 43 x 26cm, c. 1435. Gemäldegalerie, Berlin

Christ on the Cross with the Virgin and Saint John is an oil on panel painting, later transferred to canvas, attributed to the Master of the Grimacing St John, a senior member of the workshop of Jan van Eyck. It was long attributed to Jan's brother Hubert, based on stylistic similarities to portions of the "Adoration of the lamb" passage in the Ghent Altarpiece. 'The Master of the Grimacing St John' is one of only two assistants of van Eyck's whose hand can be identified across several works. He takes his notname from an imitation stone statue in a grisaille diptych wing panel of St. John the Baptist, opposite a Virgin and Child, and is also associated with a pen and pencil drawing of St Paul in Vienna.

The Master of the Grimacing St John's panel has been in the Gemäldegalerie, Berlin since 1897.

== Sources ==
- Muchembled, Robert. Cultural Exchange in Early Modern Europe, Volume 4. Cambridge: Cambridge University Press, 2007. ISBN 0-5218-4549-1
- Borchert, Till-Holger. Van Eyck. London: Taschen, 2008. ISBN 3-8228-5687-8
