= Elisabeth Dhanens =

Belgian art historian

Art historian Elisabeth Dhanens as a young woman

Elisabeth Dhanens (1915 – 11 March 2014) was a Belgian art historian specialising in Early Netherlandish painting. Dhanens studied art history at Ghent University at the Higher Institute of Art, where she earned a Ph.D in 1945. Her dissertation was a monograph on the early-16th century artist Jan van Roome, published in 1948. From 1945 to 1952 Dhanens was a researcher in Brussels at the Royal Institute for Cultural Heritage, where she worked in the documentation laboratory. From 1952 to 1976 she held a position as art inspector in East Flanders's Art Patrimony, where she collected inventories from churches for the government. Based on field work in Italy in the early 1950s, she published a monograph about Jean Boulogne in 1956, which earned her an award from the Royal Flemish Academy of Sciences, Letters and Fine Arts and a year later a Fulbright scholarship, allowing her to study in the United States.

In 1965 she published an eight-volume inventory of "churches, cities, and villages in East Flanders". The inventory of the St Bavo's Cathedral in Ghent began her lifelong passion for artists Hubert and Jan van Eyck. In her capacity as inspector, she had access to original sources which began a long scholarly examination of the Ghent Altarpiece. The original sources allowed her to separate the work from "erroneous interpretations and mystifications" and "situate it in its original context". Additionally, she studied 12th-century theologian Rupert of Deutz's commentaries, which she considered an important iconographical influence on the van Eycks. She published Van Eyck: The Ghent Altarpiece in 1973. Throughout the 1970s she continued to publish about the van Eyck brothers, culminating with the 1980 monograph Hubert and Jan van Eyck. The monograph was eagerly anticipated, according to Lorne Campbell, who wrote of it on publication that "it must take its place immediately as the standard work on the artists". According to Campbell, Dhanens brought a fresh vision to existing van Eyck scholarship, much of which had been contradictory, saying about Dhanens that she "has a considerably greater respect for historical truth and for logical deduction than most of the art historians who have previously written about the van Eycks."

In the following years she researched and published papers about artists who lived in Ghent between 1432 and 1465, advancing the theory that the Ghent Altarpiece influenced painters in Ghent during those years. She based these observations on thorough "historical, iconological, and stylistic research". From that research came a monograph about Hugo van der Goes published in 1998, and studies of Rogier van der Weyden. She believed the Uffizi Entombment, attributed to van der Weyden in 1832, was actually painted by Hans Memling.

Dhanens was a member of the Royal Flemish Academy of Belgium for Science and the Arts. From the 1970s to the 1990s she sat on boards in Belgium and edited biographies about the van Eycks. The focus of her scholarship was to research original documents and to place the works in proper historical context. She revised all the documents to do with van der Weyden up to 1800.

She died on 11 March 2014, at age 98.
