= Ghent Altarpiece =

Polyptych by Jan and Hubert van Eyck

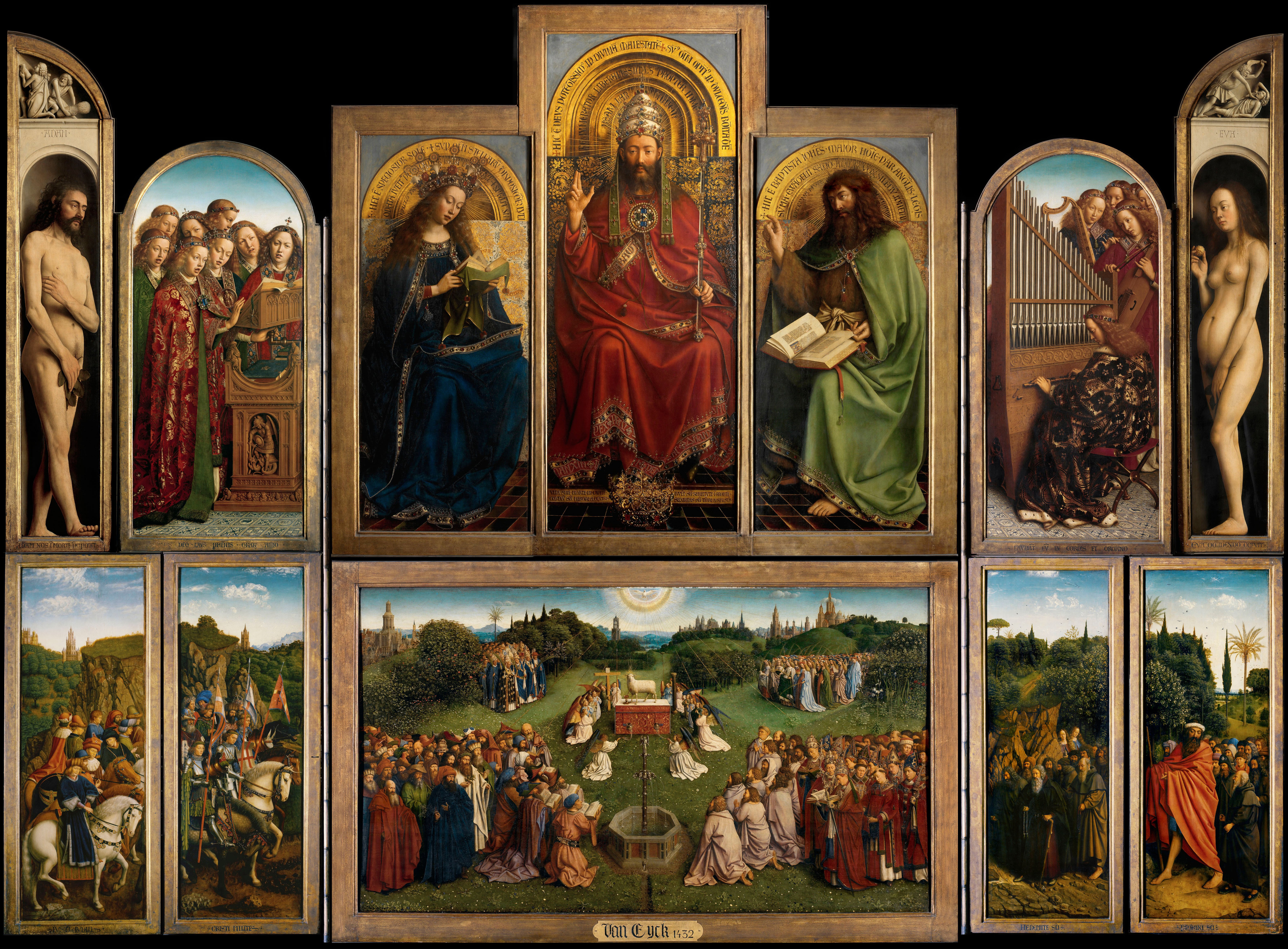
- Open View, the twelve interior panels Closed view, back panels
- Artists: Jan van Eyck, Hubert van Eyck
- Year: 1432
- Medium: Oil on oak panel
- Movement: Early Netherlandish painting
- Dimensions: 375 cm × 520 cm (148 in × 200 in)
- Location: Saint Bavo's Cathedral, Ghent, Belgium

The Ghent Altarpiece, also called the Adoration of the Mystic Lamb (Dutch: De aanbidding van het Lam Gods), (Note: The central painting is "Adoration of the Mystic Lamb".) is a very large and complex 15th-century polyptych altarpiece in St Bavo's Cathedral, Ghent, Belgium. It was begun around the mid-1420s and completed by 1432, and it is attributed to the Early Netherlandish painters and brothers Hubert and Jan van Eyck. The altarpiece is a prominent example of the transition from Middle Age to Renaissance art and is considered a masterpiece of European art, identified by some as "the first major oil painting."

The panels are organised in two vertical registers, each with double sets of foldable wings containing inner and outer panel paintings. The upper register of the inner panels represents the heavenly redemption, and includes the central classical Deësis arrangement of God (identified either as Christ the King or God the Father), flanked by the Virgin Mary and John the Baptist. They are flanked in the next panels by angels playing music and, on the far outermost panels, the figures of Adam and Eve. The central panel of the lower register shows a gathering of saints, sinners, clergy, and soldiers attendant at an adoration of the Lamb of God. There are several groupings of figures, overseen by the dove of the Holy Spirit. (Note: Eight of its twelve panel paintings are doubled-hinged shutters, allowing two distinct views depending on whether they are opened or closed; except for Sundays and festive holidays, the outer wings were closed off and covered with cloth. The outer panels contain two vertically stacked registers (rows).) The four lower panels of the closed altar are divided into two pairs; sculptural grisaille paintings of St John the Baptist and St John the Evangelist, and on the two outer panels, donor portraits of Joost Vijdt and his wife Lysbette Borluut; in the upper row are the archangel Gabriel and the Annunciation, and at the very top are the prophets and sibyls. The altarpiece is one of the most renowned and important artworks in European history.

Art historians generally agree that the overall structure was designed by Hubert during or before the mid-1420s, probably before 1422, and that the panels were painted by his younger brother Jan. Yet, while generations of art historians have attempted to attribute specific passages to either brother, no convincing separation has been established; it may be that Jan finished panels begun by Hubert.

The altarpiece was commissioned by the merchant and Ghent mayor Jodocus Vijd and his wife Lysbette as part of a larger project for the Saint Bavo Cathedral chapel. Its installation was officially celebrated on 6 May 1432. Much later, for security reasons, it was moved to the principal cathedral chapel, where it remains.

Indebted to the International Gothic as well as Byzantine and Romanic traditions, the altarpiece represented a significant advancement in Western art, in which the idealisation of the medieval tradition gives way to an exacting observation of nature and human representation. A now lost inscription on the frame stated that Hubert van Eyck maior quo nemo repertus (greater than anyone) started the altarpiece, but that Jan van Eyck—calling himself arte secundus (second best in the art)—completed it in 1432. The altarpiece is in its original location, while its original, very ornate, carved outer frame and surround, presumably harmonizing with the painted tracery, was destroyed during the Reformation; it may have included clockwork mechanisms for moving the shutters and even for playing music.

== Attribution ==
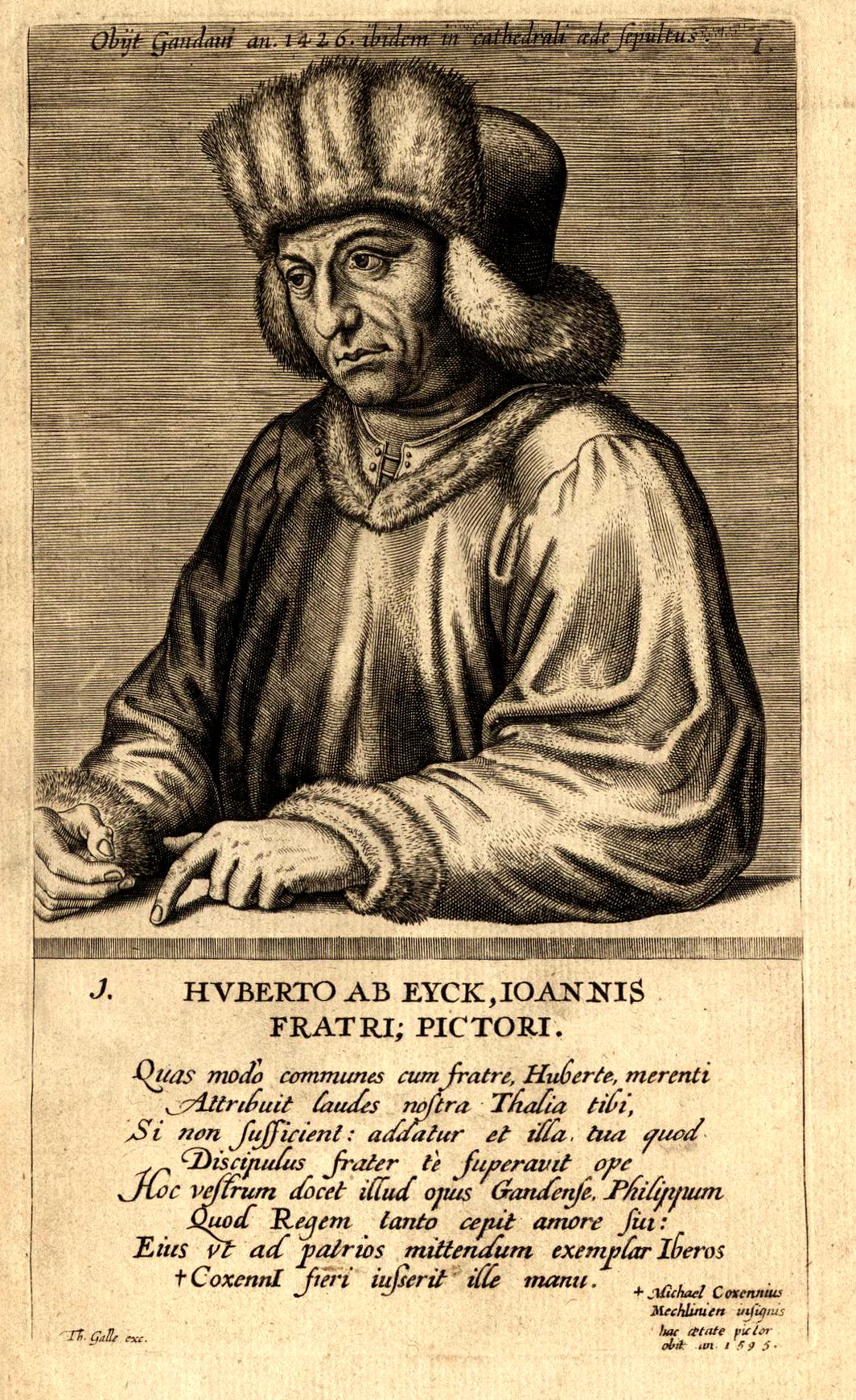
Woodcut portrait of Hubert van Eyck, Edme de Boulonois, mid-16th century

Portrait of a Man (Self Portrait?), 1433. Jan van Eyck, National Gallery, London

Art historians broadly agree that the overall structure was designed and built by Hubert in the early 1420s, and that most of the panels paintings were completed by his younger brother Jan between 1430 and 1432. Yet there has been considerable debate, and many art historians, especially in the mid 20th century, attempted to attribute specific passages to either brother. However, no convincing separation of their contributions has been established. A now lost inscription on the frame stated that Hubert van Eyck maior quo nemo repertus (greater than anyone) started the altarpiece, but that Jan van Eyck—calling himself arte secundus (second best in the art)—completed it in 1432. The original, very ornate carved outer frame and surround, presumably harmonizing with the painted tracery, was destroyed during the Reformation; it may have included clockwork mechanisms for moving the shutters and even playing music.

Attribution to the van Eyck brothers is supported by the small amount of surviving documentary evidence attached to the commission, and from Jan's signature and dating on a reverse frame. Jan seems to minimize his contribution in favour of his brother, who died six years before the work's completion in 1432. A less explicit indicator is their seeming portraits as the third and fourth horsemen in the Just Judges panel. Ramsay Homa notes lettering in the central panel of the lower register that might be read as an early formation of what was to become van Eyck's well-known signature, built around various formations of "ALS IK KAN" (As I Can), a pun on his full name; and lettering is found on the headdress of one of the prophets standing at the back of the grouping. It is written in Hebrew script that roughly translates into French as Le chapeau ... orne de trois lettres herbraiques formant le mot Saboth, or more likely as "Yod, Feh, Aleph", which when transliterated represents Jan's initials, JvE.

Since the 19th century, art historians have debated which passages are attributable to the unknown Hubert or internationally renowned Jan. In the 17th and 18th centuries, it was often assumed that Jan had found unfinished panels left behind after Hubert's death and assembled them into the current format. This view has been discounted by more recent scholarship on the basis of the overall design of the work and given the obvious gaps in quality between many passages.

It is generally accepted that the majority of the work was completed by Jan based on a design by Hubert, who probably oversaw the original design and construction of the panels. The difficulties are complicated by the fact that there is no surviving work confidently attributed to Hubert and it is thus impossible to detect his style. Instead, art historians compare individual passages to known works by Jan, looking for stylistic differences that may indicate the work of another hand. Advances in dendrochronology indicate that parts of the wing panels were felled around 1421. Allowing a seasoning time of at least 10 years, art historians assume a completion date well after Hubert's death in 1426, thus ruling out his hand from large portions of the wings.

== Style and technique ==
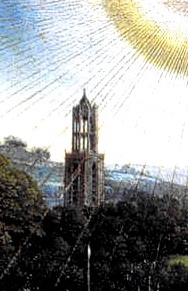
View of Utrecht Cathedral from the central inner panel

The polyptych differs in a number of aspects from the other paintings attributed to Jan van Eyck, not least in scale. It is the only one of his works intended for public, rather than private, worship and display. Van Eyck pays as much attention to the beauty of earthly things as to the religious themes. The clothes and jewels, the fountain, nature surrounding the scene, the churches and landscape in the background – are all painted with remarkable detail. The landscape is rich with vegetation, which is observed with an almost scientific accuracy, and much of it non-European.

Lighting is one of the major innovations of the polyptych. The panels contain complex light effects and subtle plays of shadow, the rendering of which was achieved through new techniques of handling both oil paint and transparent glazes. The figures are mostly cast with short, diagonal shadows which serve to, in the words of art historian Till-Holger Borchert, "not only heighten their spatial presence, but also tell us that the primary light source is located beyond the picture itself." In the Annunciation scene, shadows imply that they emanate from the daylight within the chapel in which they are housed. Further innovations can be found in the detailing of surface textures, especially in the reflections of light. These are best seen in light falling on the armour in the Knights of Christ panel, and the ripple of the water in the Fountain of life in the Adoration of the Mystic Lamb.

== Open view ==
The altarpiece was opened on feast days when the richness, colour and complexity of the inner panels was intended to contrast with the relative austerity of the outer panels. As viewed when open, the panels are organised along two registers (levels), and contain depictions of hundreds of figures. The upper level consists of seven monumental panels, each almost six feet high, and includes a large central image of Christ flanked by frames showing Mary (left) and John the Baptist (right), which contain over twenty inscriptions each referring to the figures in the central Deësis panels.

These panels are flanked by two pairs of images on the folding wings. The two panels closest to the Deësis show singers in heaven; the outermost pair show Adam and Eve, naked save for strategically placed leaves. The lower register has a panoramic landscape stretching continuously across five panels. While the individual panels of the upper tier clearly contain separate—albeit paired—pictorial spaces, the lower tier is presented as a unified Mise en scène. Of the 12 panels, eight have paintings on their reverse visible when the altarpiece is closed.

=== Upper register ===
==== Deësis ====
The three central upper panels show a Deësis of monumental and enthroned figures, each with a halo. They are the Virgin Mary to the left, John the Baptist to the right and a central figure who may be either God or Christ – a distinction much debated amongst art historians. Theories include that the panel shows Christ in Majesty dressed in priestly vestments, God the Father, or the Holy Trinity amalgamated into a single person. The figure looks directly towards the viewer with his hand raised in blessing, in a panel filled with inscriptions and symbols. There are Greek inscriptions decorated with pearls on the hem of his mantle (possibly a cope, fastened by a bejewelled morse or clasp) which are from Revelation: REX REGUM ET DOMINUS DOMINANTIUM ("King of Kings, and Lord of Lords").

The golden brocade on the throne features pelicans and vine, probable references to the blood spilled during the Crucifixion of Jesus. Pelicans were at the time believed to spill their own blood to feed their young. The vines allude to sacramental wine used to confect the Eucharist.

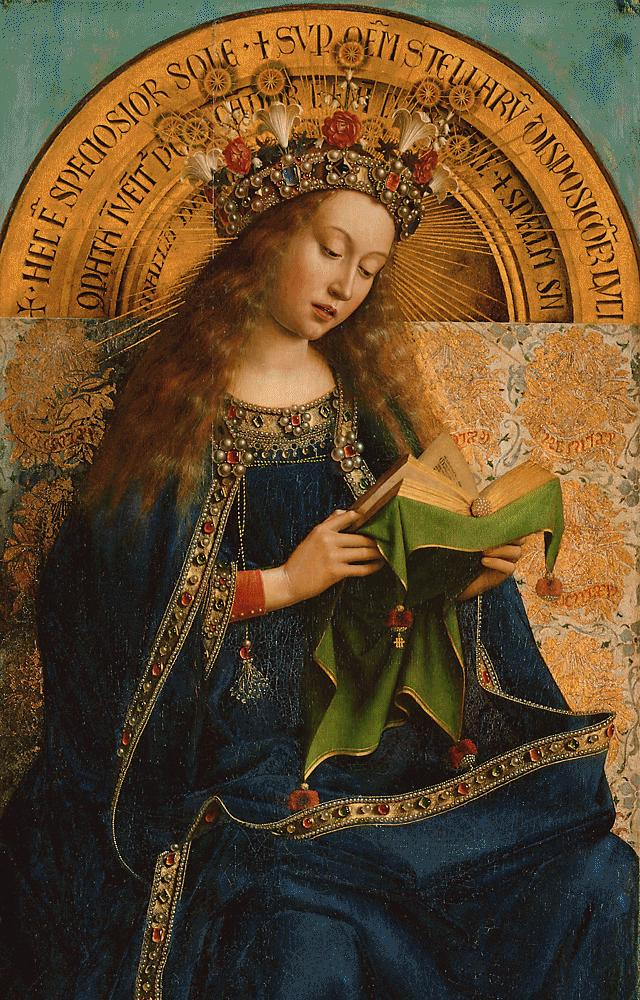
The Virgin Mary

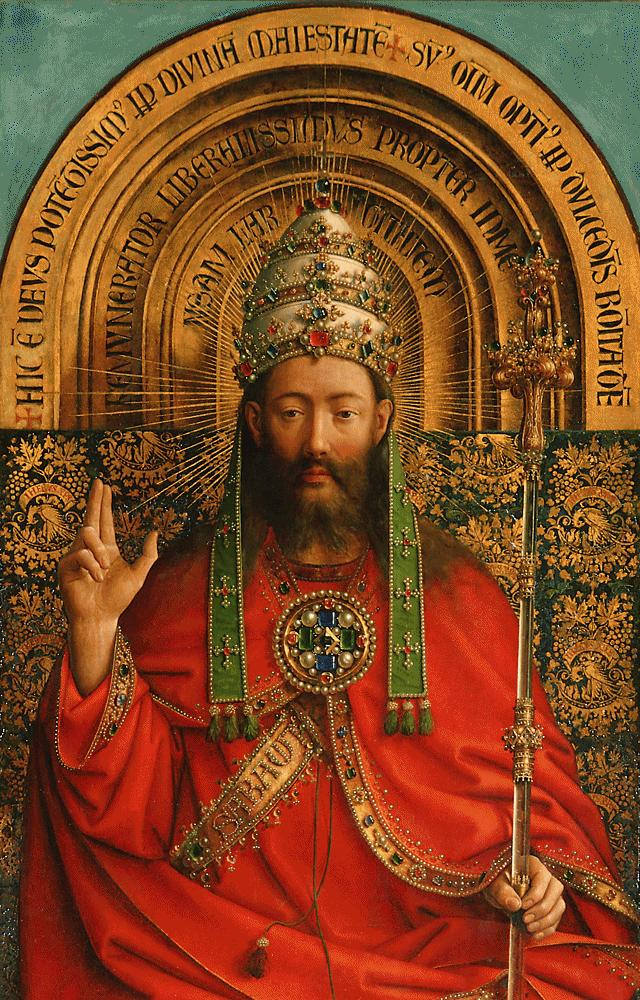
The central figure, usually referred to as "The Almighty"

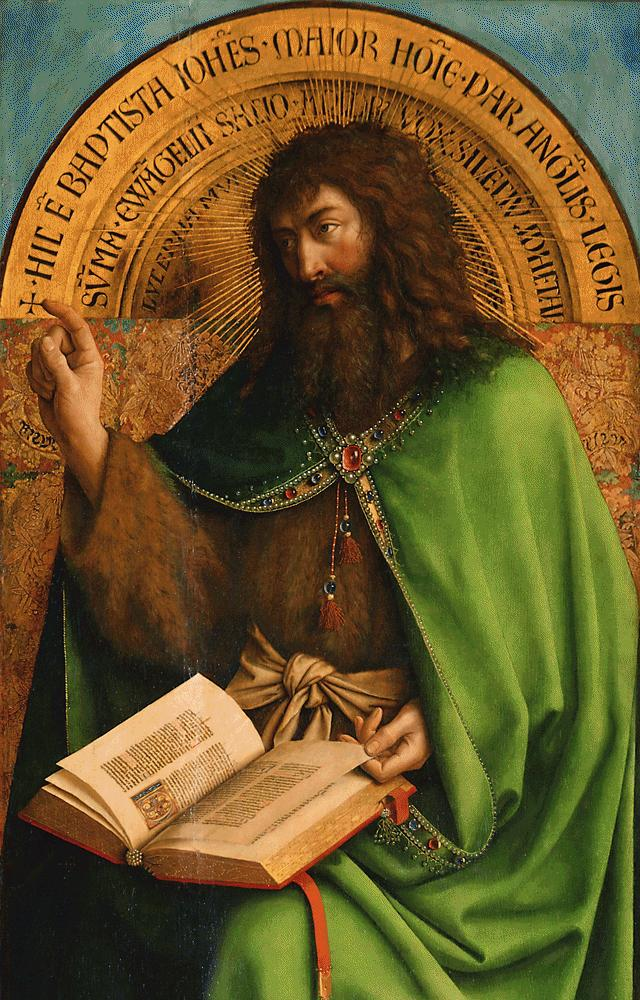
John the Baptist

An openwork crown is at his feet, and on either side the step is lined with two levels of text. The left hand upper line reads VITA SINE MORTE IN CAPITE ("Life without death on his head"), that on the right IUVENTUS SINE SENECTUTE IN FRONTE ("Youth without age on his forehead"). These are placed above—on the left and right respectively—the words GAUDIUM SINE MERORE A DEXTRIS ("Joy without sorrow on his right side") and SECURITAS SINE TIMORE A SINISTRIS ("Safety without fear on his left side"). On his head is another jewel-encrusted crown similar to the papal tiara or triregnum, with its white body, three tiers, green lappets, and monde with a cross on top.

Mary reads from a girdle book draped with a green cloth. A book is a normal attribute for Mary, as one of her titles is "Seat of Wisdom" and this image might be based on the figure in Robert Campin's Virgin Annunciate. She wears an open crown adorned with flowers and stars and is dressed as a bride. The inscription above her arched throne reads: "She is more beautiful than the sun and the army of the stars; compared to the light she is superior. She is truly the reflection of eternal light and a spotless mirror of God".

Like his aunt Mary, John the Baptist also holds a holy book – an unusual attribute; these are two of the 18 books in the entire piece. He wears a green mantle over a cilice of camel-hair, his usual attribute. He looks towards the Almighty in the centre panel, his hand also raised in blessing, uttering the words most typically attributed to him, ECCE AGNUS DEI ("Behold the Lamb of God").

It is often assumed that the foreshortening seen in the representation of God the Father indicates that the artist was familiar with the Italian painters Donatello and Masaccio. The art historian Susie Nash argues that van Eyck was already leading toward this development, and it was something he was "perfectly capable of producing without such models", and argues the technique represents "a shared interest [rather than] a case of influence."

==== Musical angels ====
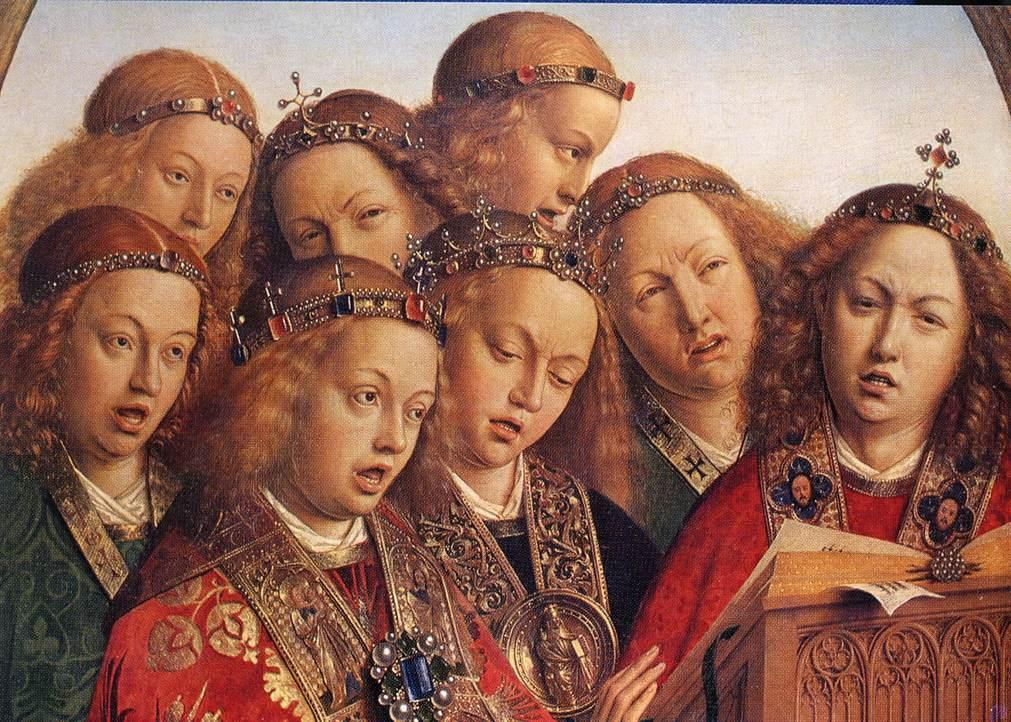
Choir of Angels

The two musical panels are commonly known by variants of the titles Singing Angels and Music-making Angels, and are both 161 cm × 69.3 cm. Each features a choir; on the left, angels gather behind a wooden carved music stand positioned on a swivel, and to the right, a group with stringed instruments gather around a pipe organ, played by a seated angel, shown full-length. The presence of the two groups on either side of the Deësis reflects a by-then well-established motif in representations of the heavens opening: that of musical accompaniment provided by celestial beings. As was common in the Low Countries in the 15th century, the angels are dressed in liturgical robes, a custom that migrated from Latin liturgical drama to the art of the period.

The angels attend the King of Kings, that is, to God the Father in the central Deësis panel. Unusually, they lack most of the attributes usually associated with angels depicted in northern art of the time. They do not have wings, and their faces are unidealised, and show a number of different individual expressions. Music historian Stanley Boorman notes that their depiction contains many earthly qualities, writing that "the naturalism is so seductive that the viewer is tempted to consider the scenes as depictions of contemporary church music." Yet he concludes that the inscriptions "reinstalls them in the heavenly sphere". In both panels the angels stand on maiolica tiles decorated with the IHS Christogram, representations of the lamb and other images.

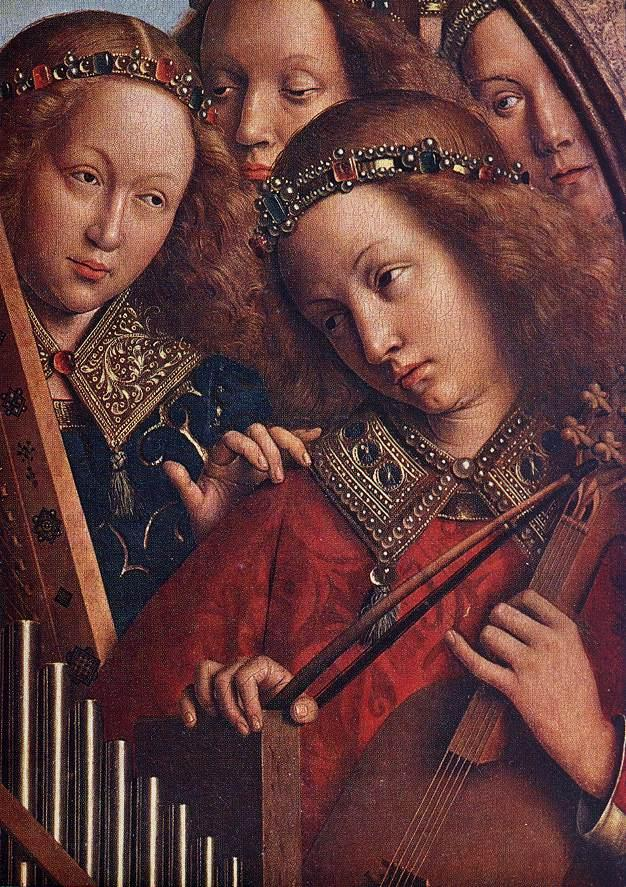
String and wind instruments

The left-hand panel's frame is inscribed with the words MELOS DEO LAUS ("Music in Praise of God"), the frame of to the right with LAUDATE EUM IN CORDIS ET ORGANO ("Praise him with stringed instruments and organs"). A number of art historians have defined the figures as angels based on their positioning and role within the overall context of the registers. They are sexless and possess cherub faces, which contrast with the realistic depictions of the other full-sized non-divine females in the work; Eve in the same register and Lysbette Borluut in the outer panels. The angels are dressed in elaborately brocaded ecclesiastical copes or chasubles, mostly painted in reds and greens. Their robes indicate that they are intended as representative of the celebration of mass before the altar in the lower central panel.

The left-hand group shows eight fair haired angels wearing crowns and gathered in front of a music stand singing, although none of them looks towards the score on the stand. As in a number of the other panels, here van Eyck used the device of the open mouth to give a sense of life and motion to his figures. Borchert writes that the emphasis on the open mouths is "specifically motivated by the desire to characterize the angel's facial expressions according to the various ranges of polyphonic singing. To that end the position of the angel's tongues is carefully registered, as is that of their teeth." Art historian Elisabeth Dhanens notes how "One can easily see by their singing who is the soprano, who is the alto, who is the tenor and who is the bass".

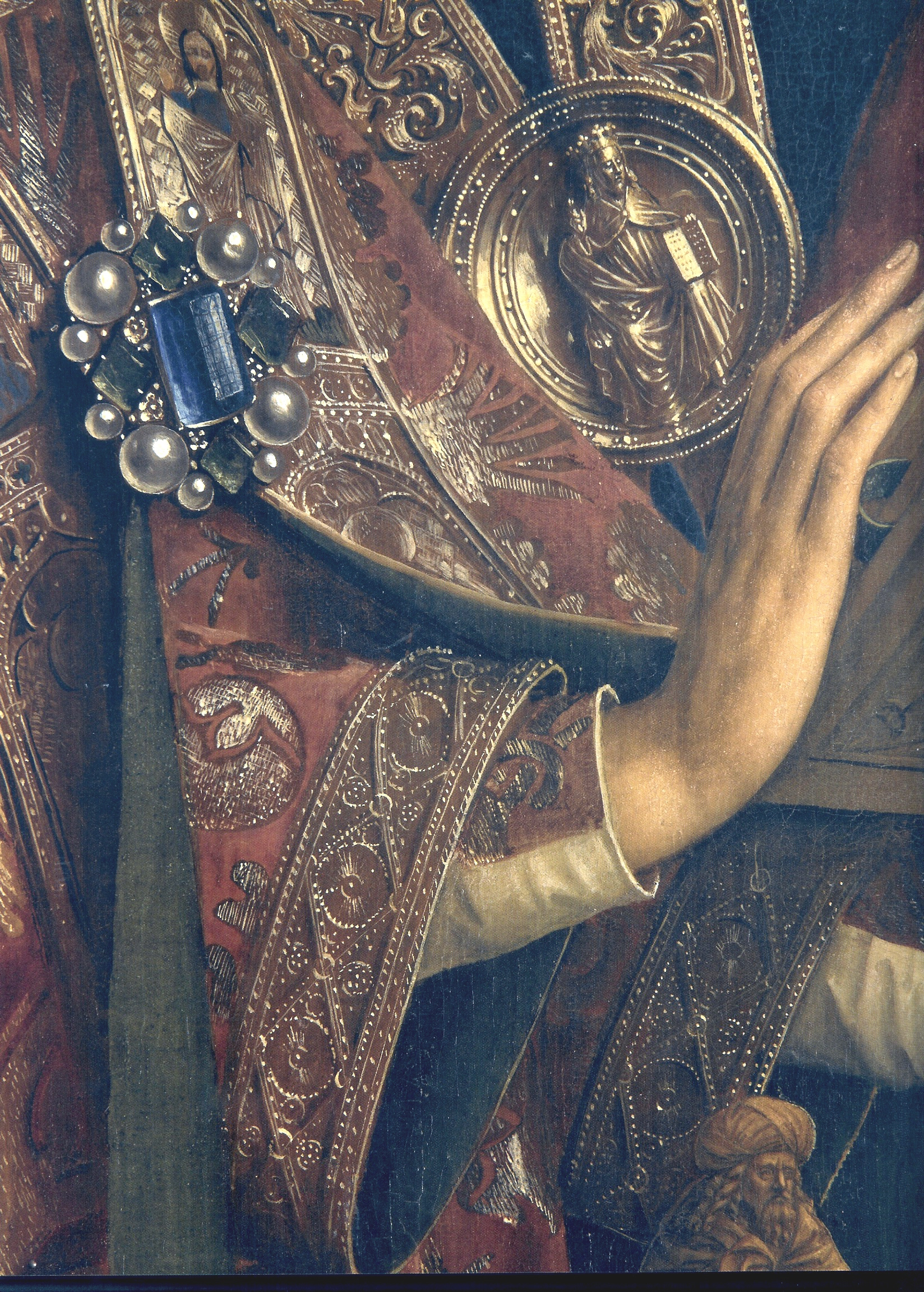
Detail of the lead Angel

The figures are positioned in a wave-like order of body height, with the orientation of each of the eight faces in looking in different directions. A number of scholars have remarked on their physiognomy. Their cherub faces and long, open, curly hair are similar but also show a clear intention by the artist to establish individual traits. Four angels are shown frowning, three have narrowed eyelids which give the appearance of peering, a trait also seen in some of the apostles in the "Adoration of the Lamb". Pächt does not see Jan's hand in the rendering of their expressions and speculates if they are remnants from Hubert's initial design.

In the right-hand panel, the only angel fully visible is the organist around whom the others gather. Although a larger group is suggested, only another four angel's faces can be seen in the closely cropped huddle. These other angels carry stringed instruments, including a small harp and a type of viol. Their instruments are shown in remarkable detail. The organ at which Saint Cecilia sits is detailed with such precision that, in places, its metal surfaces show reflections of light.

Modern musicologists have been able to recreate a working copy of the instrument. Until the Trecento, when the idea of orchestration was introduced, music-playing angels were typically winged, depicted holding stringed or wind instruments as they hovered "on the wing" around on the edges of images of saints and deities. In French illuminated manuscripts of the first two decades of the 15th century, winged angels often seemingly floated on the margins of the page, as illustrations to the accompanying text.

==== Adam and Eve ====
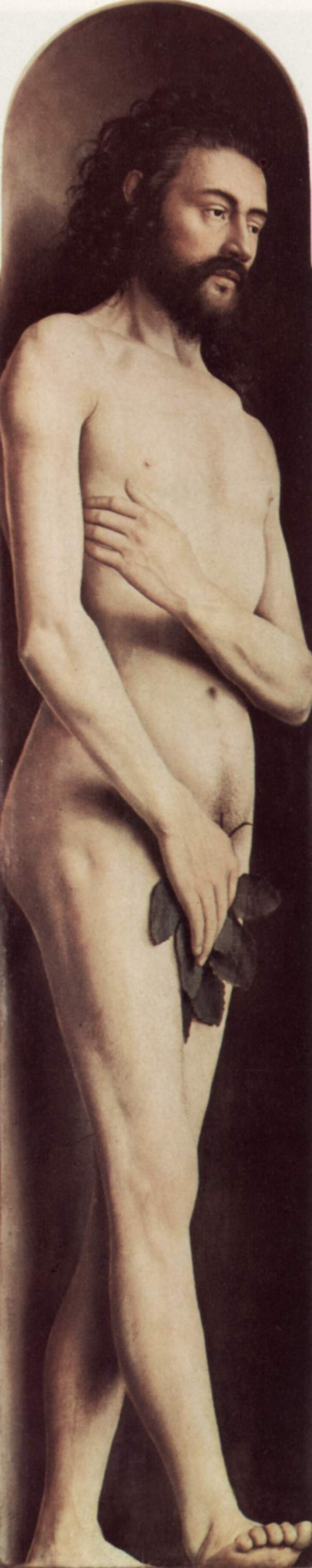
Adam stepping out

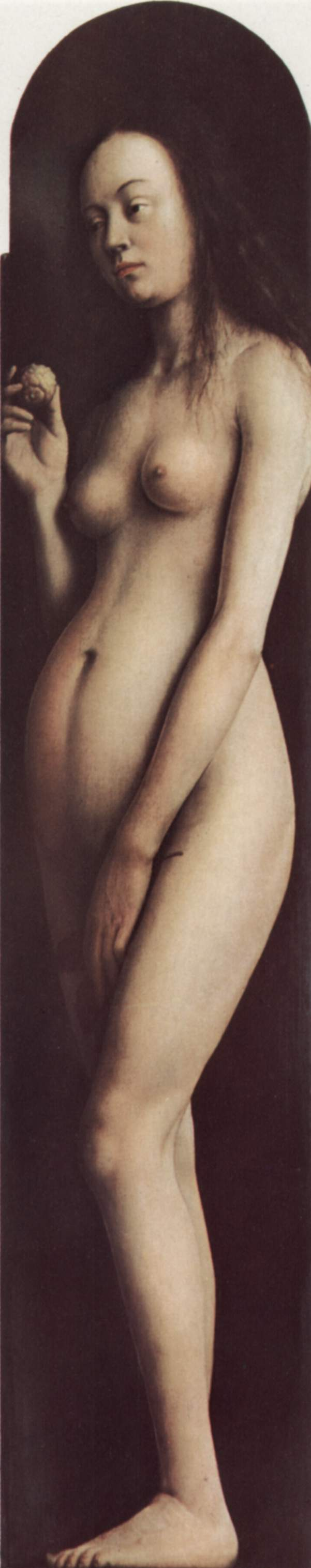
Eve: contemporary ideal for female figure

The two outer panels show near life-sized nudes of Adam and Eve standing in niches. They are one of the earliest and most direct treatments of the nude in Western art, and almost contemporary with the equally ground-breaking figures in Masaccio's Expulsion from the Garden of Eden (Florence, c. 1425). They face inwards towards the angels and the Deësis, separating them. They self-consciously attempt to cover their nakedness with a leaf as in the Genesis account (although apparently not a figleaf), indicating that they are depicted as after the fall of man. Eve holds a fruit in her right hand. Erwin Panofsky drew particular attention to this passage, describing it as emblematic of the "disguised" symbolism he saw through the work. Both figures' eyes are downcast and they appear to have forlorn expressions. Their apparent sadness has led many art historians to wonder about van Eyck's intention in this portrayal. Some have questioned if they are ashamed of their committal of original sin, or dismayed at the world they now look upon.

The painter's unflinching realism is especially evident in these two panels. The depiction of Eve exemplifies International Gothic ideal of beauty as developed from around the start of the 14th century, pioneered by the Limbourg brothers, especially their Adam and Eve in the Très Riches Heures du Duc de Berry. Comparing the Limbourg's Eve to a classical female nude, Kenneth Clark observed that "her pelvis is wider, her chest narrower, her waist higher; above all there is the prominence given to her stomach". Clark describes her as "a proof of how minutely 'realistic' a great artist may be in the rendering of details, and yet subordinate the whole to an ideal form. Hers is the supreme example of the bulb-like body. The weight-bearing leg is concealed, and the body is so contrived that on one side is the long curve of the stomach, on the other the downward sweep of the thigh, uninterrupted by any articulation of bone or muscle."

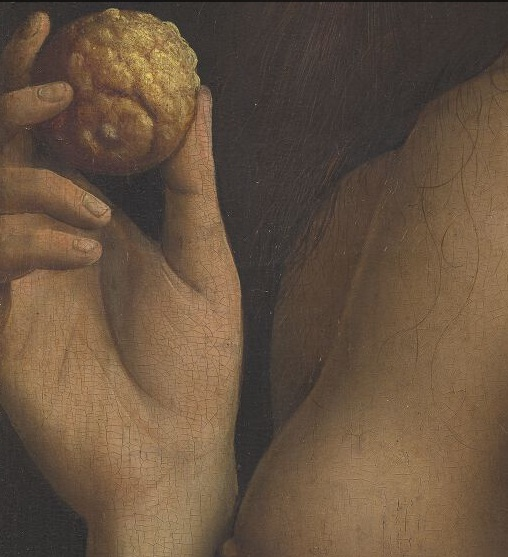
Eve holding a citrus fruit

The precision and detail with which their nakedness is rendered has historically been a source of offense. During a visit to the cathedral in 1781, Emperor Joseph II found them so disagreeable that he demanded they be removed. The couple's nakedness further offended 19th century sensibilities, when their presence in a church came to be considered unacceptable. The panels were replaced by reproductions in which the figures were dressed in skin cloth; these are still on display in Saint Bavo Cathedral. In comparison to contemporary depictions of Adam and Eve, this version is very spare and omits the usual motifs associated with the theme; there is no serpent, tree or any trace of the Garden of Eden normally found in contemporary paintings.

Adam's foot appears to protrude out of the niche into the viewer's space. Similarly, Eve's arm, shoulder and hip appear to extend beyond her architectural setting. These elements give the panel a three-dimensional aspect. These trompe-l'œils become more pronounced when the wings are turned slightly inwards, and contract to the fact that the polyptych was wider than the original setting and could never be opened fully.

The grisaille above Adam shows Abel sacrificing the first lamb of his flock, and his brother Cain presenting crops to the Lord. Above Eve is a representation of Abel being murdered by Cain with what appears to be an ass' jawbone.

=== Lower register ===
A continuous panoramic landscape unifies the five panels of the lower register. The large central panel shows the adoration of the Lamb of God (Agnus Dei) arranged in a scene derived from the Gospel of John. A series of crowds of people stream towards the lamb to worship; four groupings congregate at each corner of the central panel, another four arrive in the two pairs of outer panels – representing the Warriors of Christ and Just Judges on the left-hand side, and the holy hermits and pilgrims on the right. Of the eight groupings only one consists of females. The groupings are segregated by their relationship to the old and new testaments, with those from the older books positioned to the left of the altar.

Among the pilgrims is Saint Christopher, patron saint of travellers. At the rear of the hermits on the inner right-hand panel is Mary Magdalene, carrying unguents.

==== Adoration of the Mystic Lamb ====
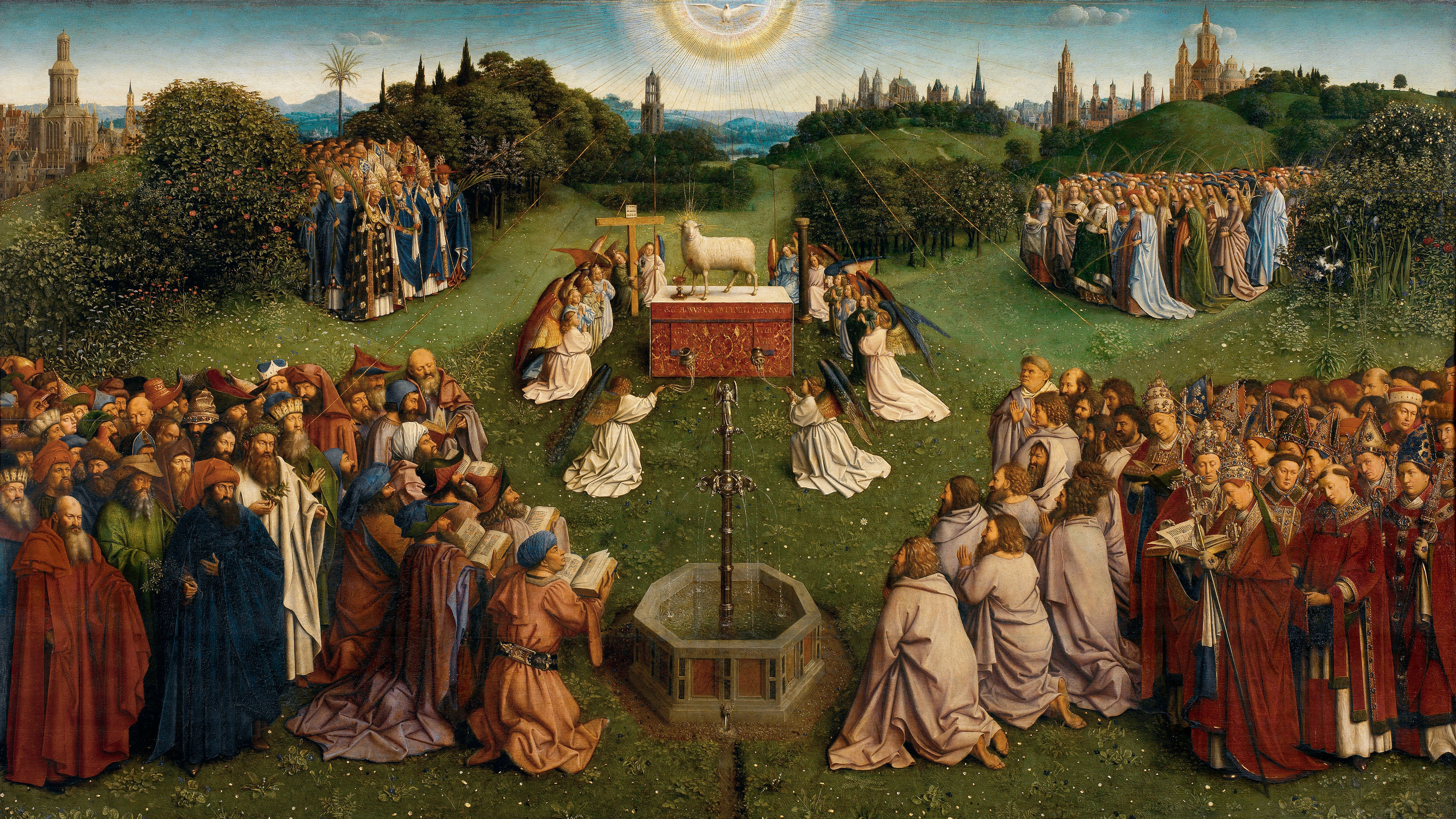
The central Adoration of the Mystic Lamb panel. The groupings of figures are, from top left anti-clockwise: the male martyrs, the pagan writers and Jewish prophets, the male saints, and the female martyrs.

Measuring 134.3 × 237.5 cm, the center panel has as its centerpiece an altar on which the Lamb of God is positioned, standing in a verdant meadow, while the foreground shows a fountain. Five distinct groups of figures surround altar and fountain. In the mid-ground two further groups of figures are seen gathering; the dove of the Holy Spirit is above. The meadow is framed by trees and bushes; with the spires of Jerusalem visible in the background. Dhanens says the panel shows "a magnificent display of unequaled color, a rich panorama of late medieval art and the contemporary world-view." The iconography, suggested by the groupings of the figures, appears to follow the liturgy of All Saints' Day.

The lamb stands on an altar, and is surrounded by 14 angels arranged in a circle, some holding symbols of Christ's Passion, and two swing censers. The lamb (Note: This portion of the panel was restored following damage suffered in an 1822 fire; however the restoration was not complete and some of the passages were abandoned mid-way. The most startling result of this is that a portion of an underdrawing of the lamb was left exposed, leading to it appearing to have four ears until the 2020 restoration which removed the overpainting. See Pächt (1999), 123) has a wound on its breast from which blood gushes into a golden chalice, yet it shows no outward expression of pain, a reference to Christ's sacrifice. The lamb has a human-like face which appears to be looking directly out of the panel, similar to the subjects of Jan van Eyck's single head portraits. The angels have multicoloured wings and hold instruments of Christ's passion, including the cross and the crown of thorns. The antependium on the upper portion of the front of the altar is inscribed with the words taken from John 1:29; ECCE AGNUS DEI QUI TOLLIT PECCATA MUNDI ("Behold the Lamb of God who takes away the sins of the world"). The lappets bear the phrases IHESUS VIA ("Jesus the Way") and VERITAS VITA ("the Truth, the Life").

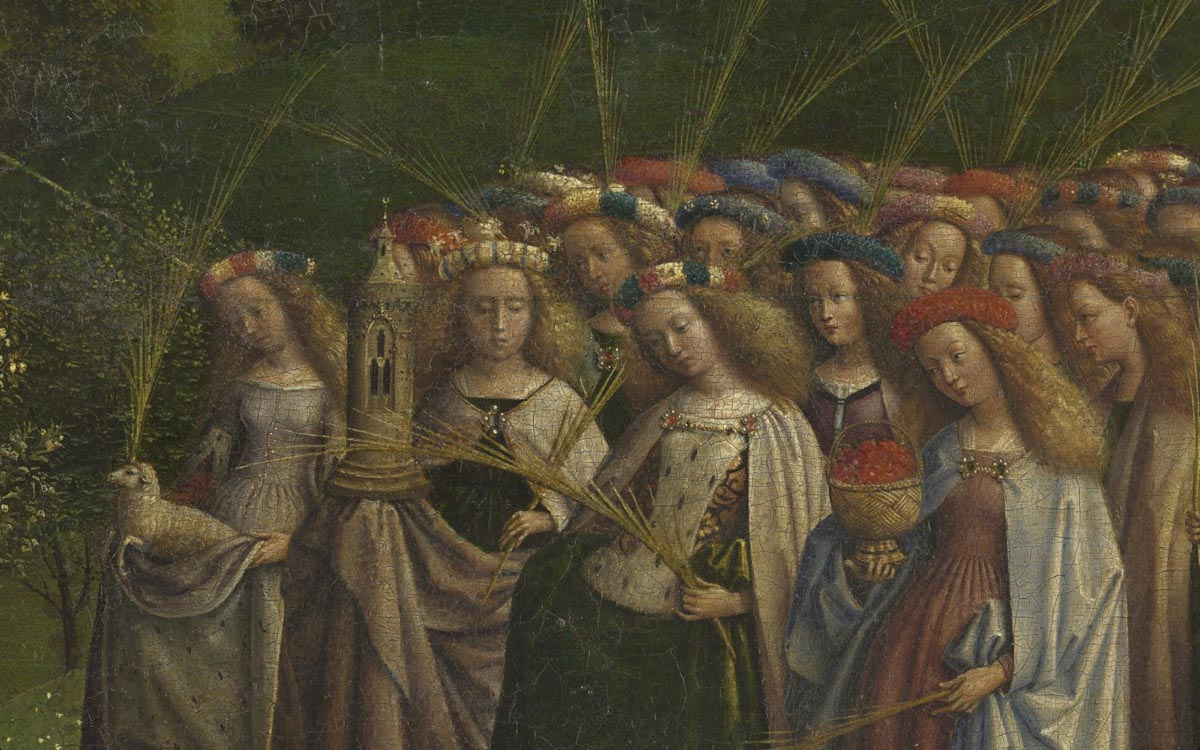
Female martyrs (with palms) and saints gathered to worship Christ

A dove, representing the Holy Spirit, hovers low in the sky directly above the lamb, surrounded by concentric semicircles of white and yellow hues of varying luminosity, the outermost of which appear like nimbus clouds. Thin golden beams emanating from the dove resemble those surrounding the head of the lamb, as well as those of the three figures in the Deësis in the upper register. The rays seem to have been painted by van Eyck over the finished landscape and serve to illuminate the scene in a celestial, supernatural light. This is especially true with the light falling on the saints positioned directly in front of the altar. The light does not give reflection or throw shadow, and has traditionally been read by art historians as representing the New Jerusalem of Revelation which in 21:23, had "no need of the sun, neither of the moon, to shine in it; for the glory of God did Lighten it".

The illumination contrasts with the natural and directional lighting of the four upper interior wings and of each of the outer wings. It has been interpreted as a device to emphasize the presence of the divine and accentuate the paradise of the central landscape. The dove as the Holy Spirit, and the lamb as Jesus, are positioned on the same axis as that of God The Father in the panel directly above; a reference to the Holy Trinity.

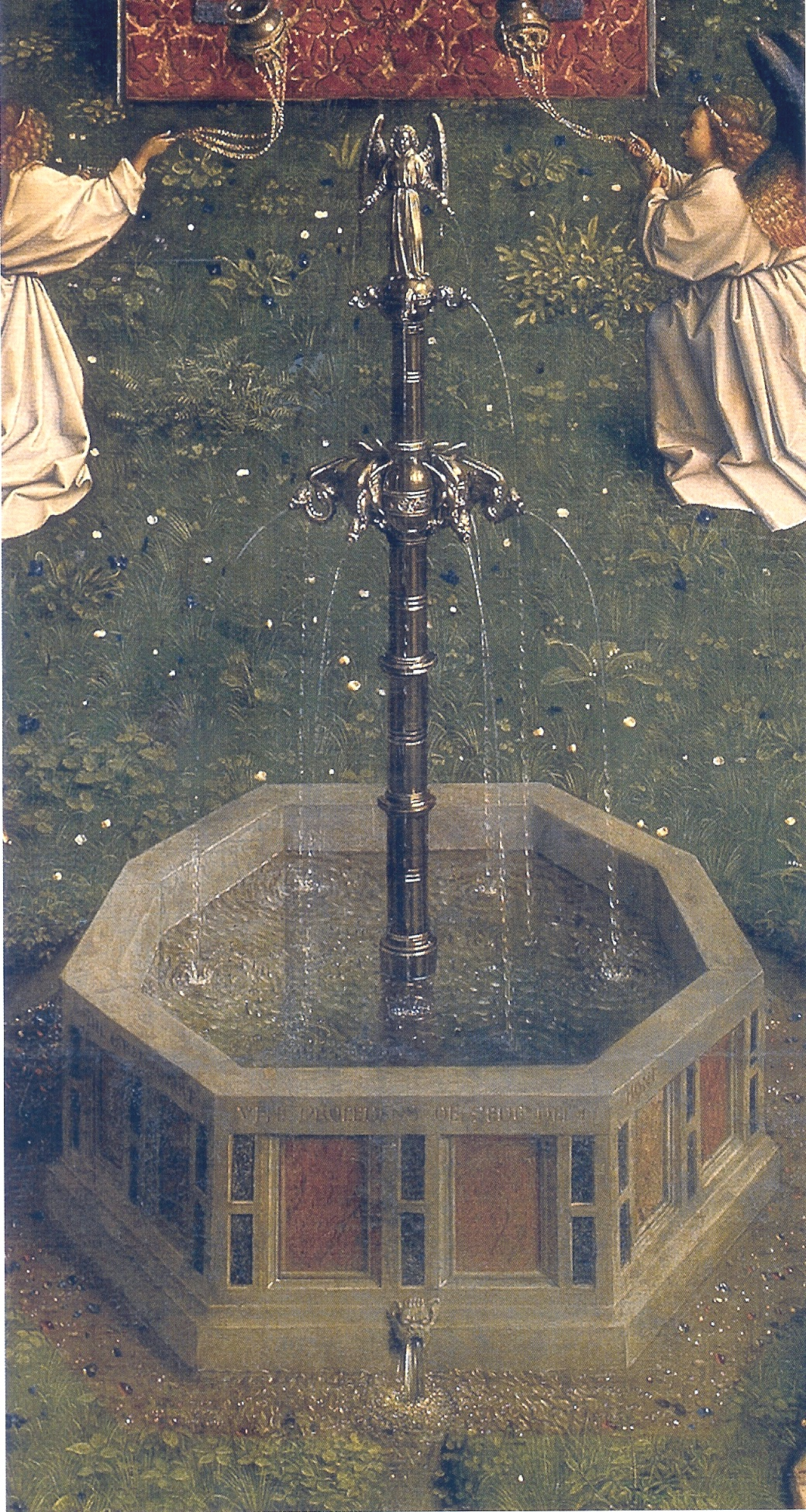
The fountain of life

In the center foreground, the fountain of life consists of a large stream of water, ending with a jewel-laden bed. In the distance, a minutely detailed cityscape recalls New Jerusalem. The detail and close attention to landscape and nature is at a level previously unseen in Northern European art. The numerous recognisable species of plants are minutely depicted with high levels of botanical accuracy. Similarly, the clouds and rock formations in the distance contain degrees of verisimilitude that evince studied observation. The far landscape contains representations of actual churches, while the depiction of the mountains beyond contain the first known example in art of aerial perspective. Yet the panel does not strive for exact realism; the sum of the forensically detailed natural elements, in combination with the apparition of the Holy Spirit and extended beams of light, serve to create a wholly individual and uniquely creative interpretation of a classic biblical scene.

===== Fountain of life =====
The inscription on the fountain's rim reads HIC EST FONS AQUE VITE PROCEDENS DE SEDE DEI + AGNI ("This is the fountain of the water of life, proceeding out of the throne of God and of the Lamb", cf. Rev. 22:1), symbolizing the fountain of life is "watered by the blood of the Lamb". The column at the fountain center shows an angel above dragons in bronze, from which streams of water fall into its basin. A vertical axis forms between the fountain, altar and the dove, signifying the agreeing testimony of The Spirit, water and the blood, as cited in 1 John 5:6–8. There is also similarity between the altar, the ring of angels, and the multiple figures arranged around the fountain.

===== Prophets, Apostles, church figures =====
The representations of figures gathering on each side of the fountain are drawn from biblical, pagan and contemporary ecclesiastical sources. Some are crowded around the fountain in what Pächt describes as two "processions of figures [that] have crowded to a halt". To the left are representatives of figures from Judaism and prophets who have foretold the coming of Christ; to the right are representatives from the Church. The figures directly to the left of the fountain represent witnesses from the Old Testament; dressed in pink robes, kneeling, reading aloud from open copies of the Bible, facing the mid-ground with backs turned to the viewer.

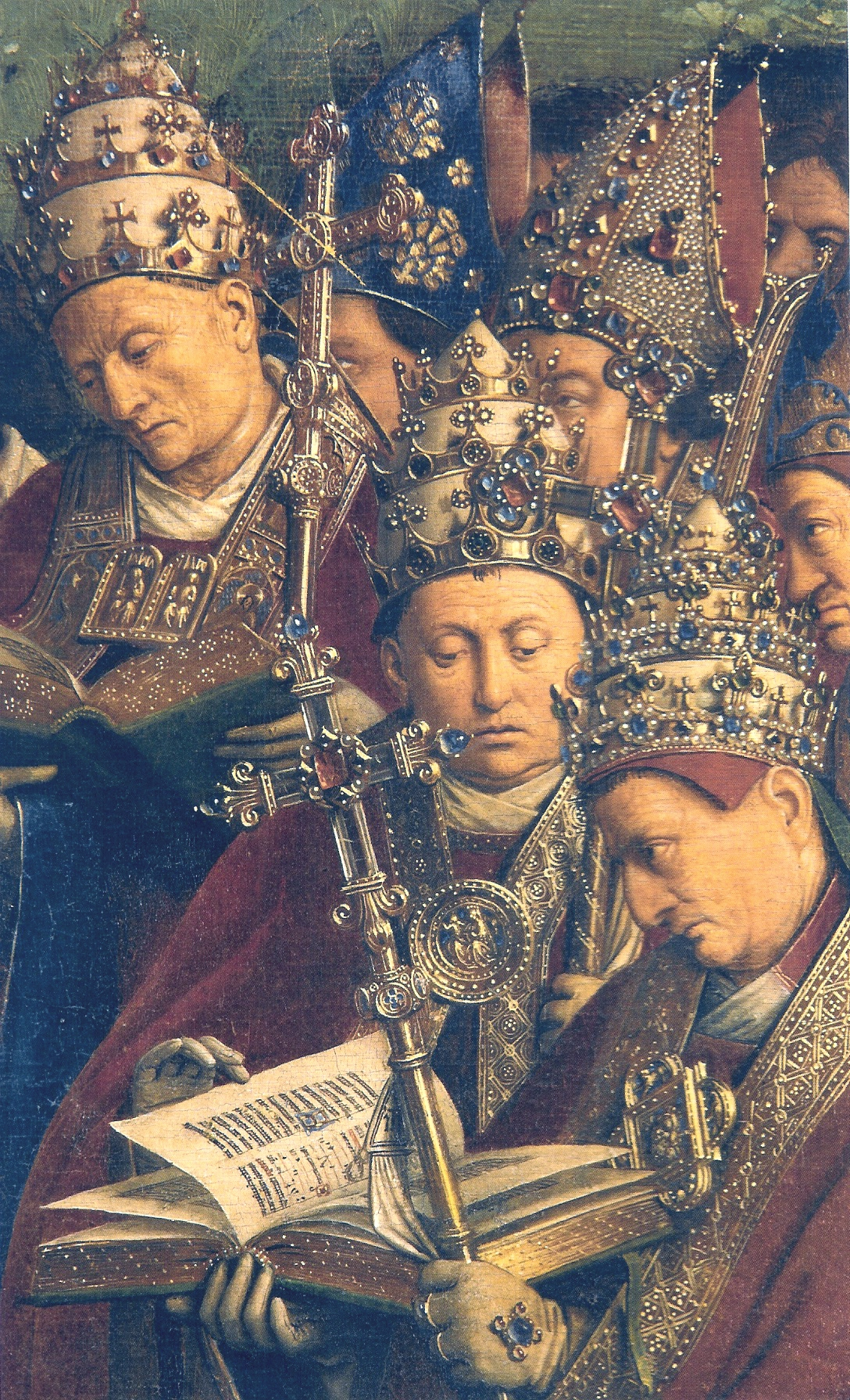
Three of the figures in the grouping to the right of the fountain can be identified as Martin V, Gregory VII and Antipope Alexander V.

A larger group of pagan philosophers and writers stand behind them. These men seem to have travelled from all over the world, given the Oriental faces of some and their different styles of headdresses. The figure in white, holding a laurel wreath, is generally accepted to be Virgil, who is said to have predicted the coming of the Saviour. Isaiah stands to his side holding a twig, a symbol of his own prophecy of Christ as recorded in Isaiah 11:1.

On the right, twelve apostles from the New Testament kneel, and behind them is a group of male saints. These are dressed in red vestments symbolizing martyrs, the Popes and other clergy representing the church hierarchy. A number are recognizable, including Saint Stephen who carries the rocks with which he was stoned. Three popes in the foreground represent the Western Schism—a dispute that festered and lingered in Ghent—and are identifiable as Martin V, Gregory VII and Antipope Alexander V. Dhanens suggests the positioning of popes standing beside antipope shows "an atmosphere of reconciliation".

===== Confessors and martyrs =====
The groups of figures in the mid-ground, to the left and right of the altar, are known as the male and female martyrs. Identifiable biblical figures carry palms. They enter the pictorial space as though through a path in the foliage, males standing to the left, women to the right. The female martyrs, sometimes known as the holy virgins, are gathered by an abundant meadow, a symbol of fertility. A number are identified by their attributes: in front St. Agnes carries a lamb, St. Barbara holds a tower, while St. Dorothy carries flowers. Further back St. Ursula carries an arrow. The men on the left include confessors, popes, cardinals, abbots and monks who are dressed in blue.

===== Just Judges and the Knights of Christ =====
The wing panels to the left of the "Adoration of the Mystic Lamb" show groups of approaching knights and judges. Their biblical source can be identified from inscriptions on the panel frames. The far left-hand panels contain lettering reading "IUSTI IUDICES" (Righteous (or Just) Judges), the inside left panel reads "CHRISTI MILITES" (Warriors of Christ). The presence of the Judges, none of whom were canonised saints, is an anomaly which art historians have long sought to explain. The most likely explanation is that they refer to Jodocus Vijd's position as a city alderman.

The Just Judges may contain portraits of Jan and Hubert as the third and fourth Judges on horseback. The evidence is based on the similarity of one of the figures to Jan's 1433 Portrait of a Man, now in the National Gallery, London, generally thought to be a self-portrait. The second, closer, figure is thought to be Hubert because of his facial similarity to Jan. Although the judge in the Ghent panel appears to be younger than the sitter in the London painting, they wear similar chaperons with the cornette tightly bound around the bourrelet. The judges in the Ghent panel became the basis for a number of later portraits of the brothers, including that of Dominicus Lampsonius.

===== Flora =====
The Ghent altar shows depictions of herbs, shrubs, (mainly Mediterranean) trees, lichens, mosses and ferns, many of which are so lifelike that orange and pomegranate trees, date palms and cypresses, rose bushes and vines as well as lilies, iris, peonies, lily of the valley, woodruff, daisies, can be identified. This has received scholarly attention for at least two centuries. In 1822 Johanna Schopenhauer identified many of the plants in the flora of the Ghent altar, including medicinal plants A number of them have a connection to the Christian symbolism

In 1984, the ecologist Sam Segal counted 81 different plants. In 1996, German biologist Esther Gallwitz published a plant guide to the flora of the Ghent altar, describing their symbolism and in 2018, the latest critical examination after restoration of the Ghent altar piece found 75 plants, 48 of which could be determined with certainty and 44 of which appear on the panel of the adoration of the lamb, according to the exhibition catalogue.

== Closed view ==
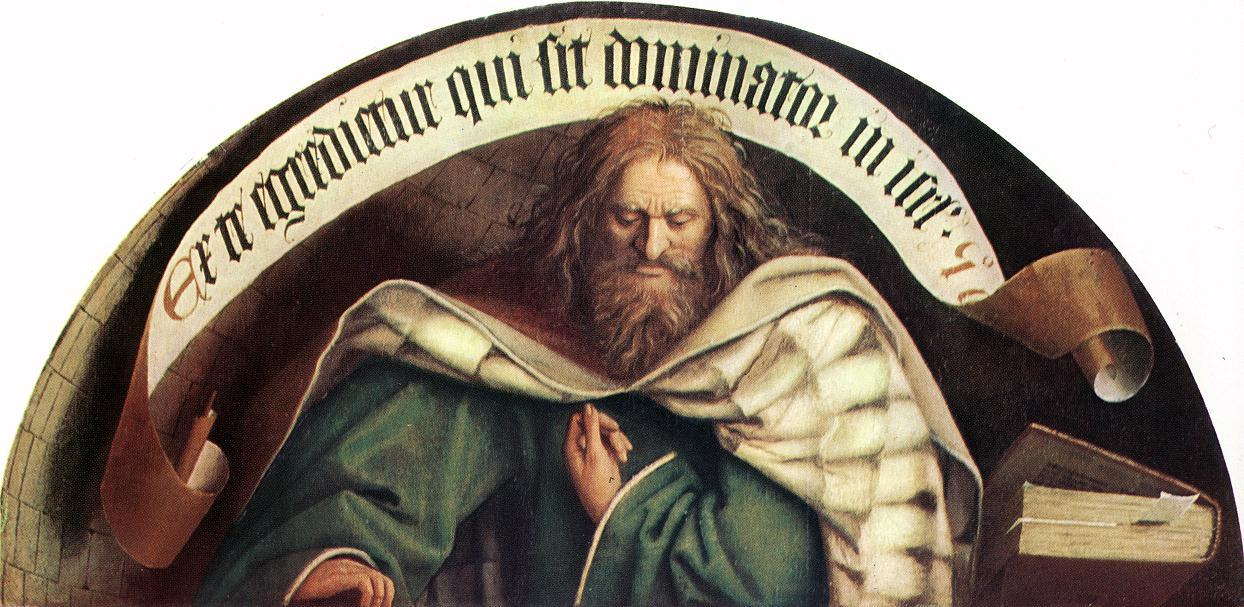
Detail of the prophet Micah in the right lunette

The altarpiece measures 375 × 260 cm when the shutters are closed. The upper panels contain lunettes showing prophets and Sibyls looking down on the annunciation; the lower tier shows the donors on the far left and right panels flanked by saints. The exterior panels are executed with relative sparseness in comparison to the often fantastical colour and abundance of the interior scenes. Their settings are earthly, pared down and relatively simple. Yet there is the same striking use of illusionism which also characterises the inner panels; this is especially true of the faux stone grisaille statues of the saints. Lighting is used to great effect to create the impression of depth; van Eyck handles the fall of light and casting of shadow to make the viewer feel as if the pictorial space is influenced or lit by light entering from the chapel in which he stands.

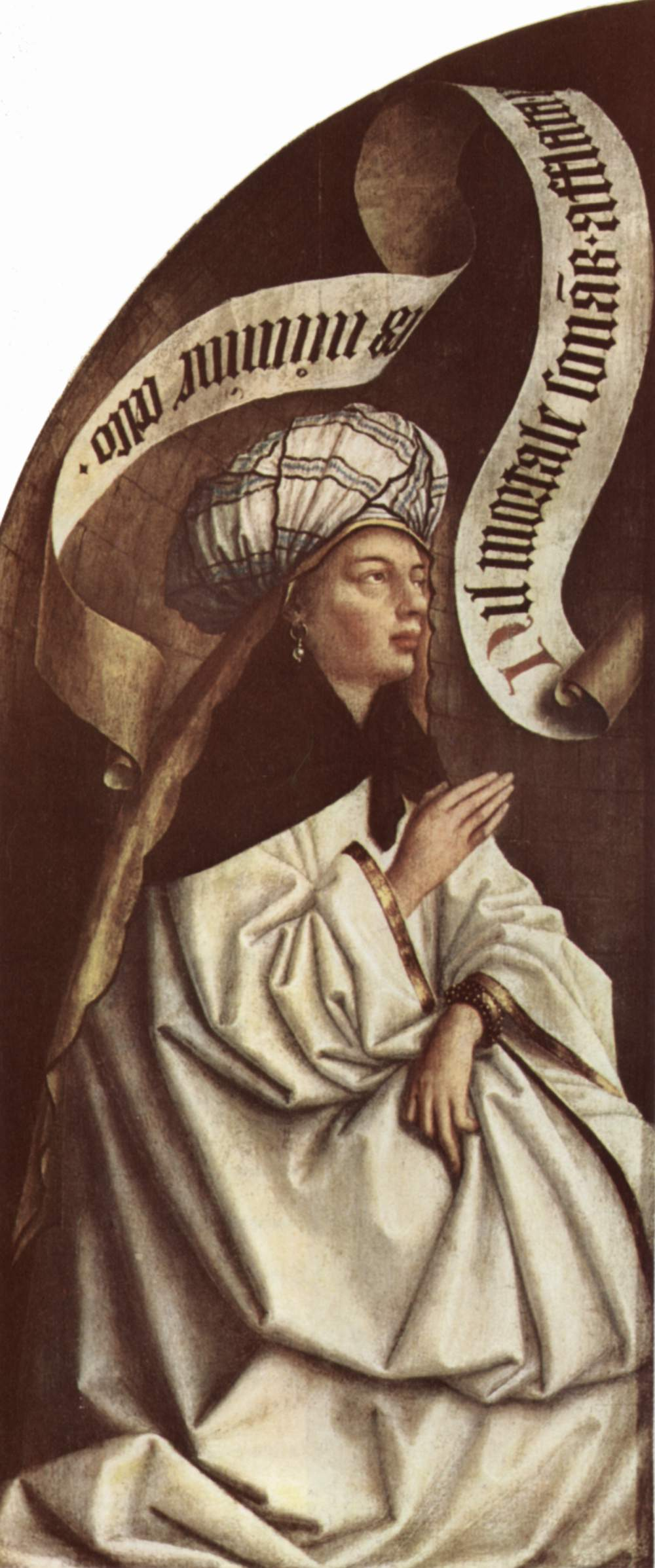
Detail showing the Erythraean Sibyl

The figures in the lunettes refer to prophecies of the coming of Christ. The far left lunette shows the prophet Zechariah and the far right one shows Micah. The two much taller inner shutters show the Erythraean Sibyl (on the left) and the Cumaean Sibyl on the right. Each panel includes a text inscribed on a floating ribbon or "banderole", while the identities of the figures are carved on the lower border of each panel. Zechariah's text, taken from Zechariah 9:9, reads EXULTA SATIS FILIA SYON JUBILA ECCE REX TUUS VENIT ("Rejoice greatly, O daughter of Zion ... behold, your king comes"), while the Erythraean Sibyl's words are NIL MORTALE SONAS AFFLATA ES NUMINE CELSO ("Sounding nothing mortal you are inspired by power from on high"). To the right the Cumaean Sibyl's reads REX ALTISSIMUS ADVENIET PER SECULA FUTURUS SCILICET IN CARNE ("The Highest King shall come and shall be in the flesh through the ages").

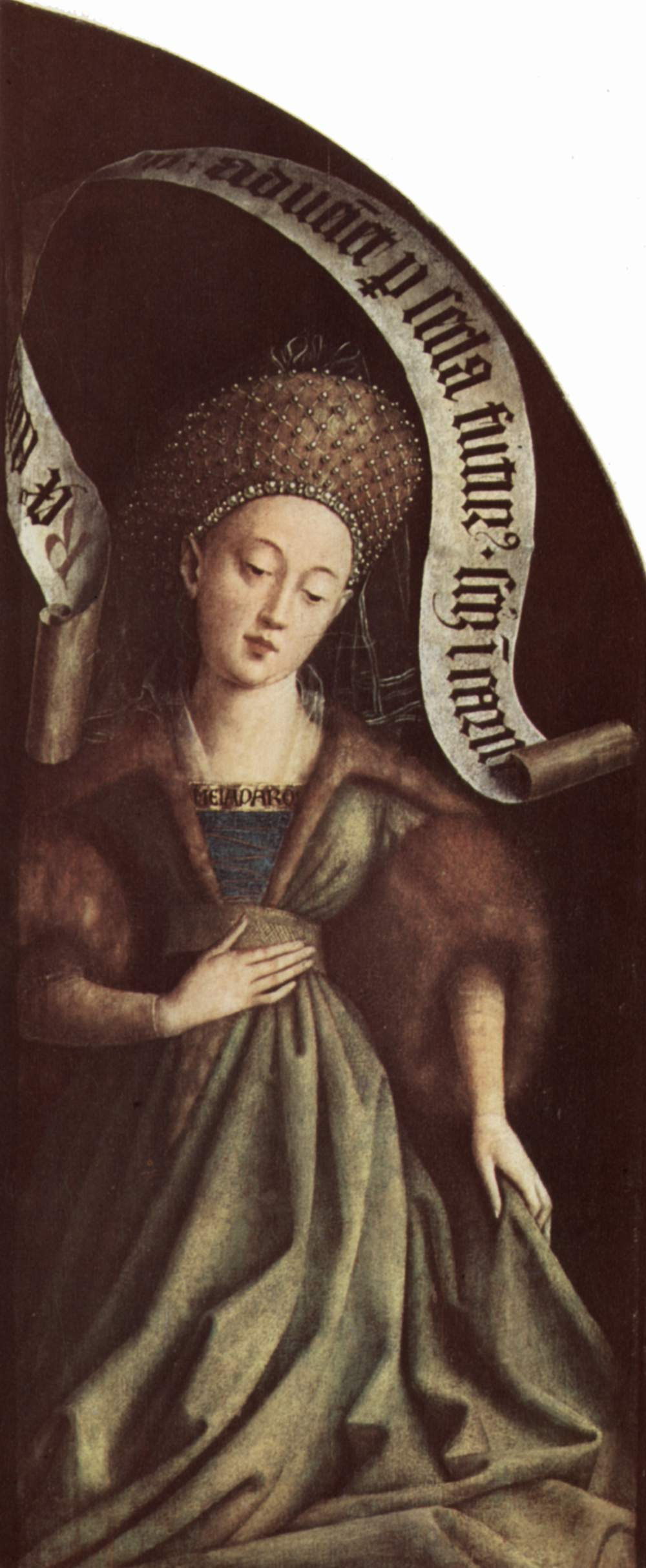
Detail showing the Cumaean Sibyl

Zechariah and Micah look down on the fulfilment of their prophecies contained in the banderoles floating behind them. The Erythraean Sibyl is shown observing, while the Cumaean Sibyl, wearing a green dress with thick fur sleeves, gazes down at Mary, her hand held in empathy over her own womb. Micah's lunette employs one of the first instances of an illusionistic motif best known from Petrus Christus's Portrait of a Carthusian (c.1446), wherein the sense of the boundary between the painting, frame and viewer's space becomes blurred. In this instance, the prophet knowingly places his hand outwards on the lower border of the frame.

In October 1428 van Eyck was a member of a Burgundian embassy sent to secure the hand of Isabella, eldest daughter of John I of Portugal (1385–1433) for Philip. After a storm forced them to spend four weeks in England, the Burgundians arrived in Lisbon in December. In January, they met the King in the castle of Aviz, and van Eyck painted the Infanta's portrait, probably in two versions, to accompany the two separate groups who left by sea and by land on 12 February to report the terms to the Duke. The portraits are untraced, but one is preserved in a drawing (Germany, priv. col., see Sterling, fig.), which indicates that Jan used the princess's Portuguese dress for the Erythrean sibyl on the Ghent Altarpiece.

In the mid-20th century, art historian Volker Herzner noted the facial similarity between the Cumaean Sibyl and Philip's wife Isabella of Portugal, especially as she is portrayed in van Eyck's lost 1428–29 betrothal portrait. (Note: The portrait is known today from a 17th-century pencil copy. Other art historians have suggested that the Virgin in van Eyck's Washington Annunciation bears Isabella's face. See Wolff, Hand (1987), 81) Herzner speculated that the text in the banderole in the sibyl's panel has a double meaning, referring not only to the coming of Christ but also to the 1432 birth of Philip's first son and heir to survive infancy. Others reject this idea, given the high rates of infant mortality at the time, and the connotations of bad luck usually associated with acclaiming a son before he is born.

=== Annunciation ===
Beneath the lunettes are the four panels of the upper register. The two outer panels of the middle register show the Annunciation to Mary, with the Archangel Gabriel on the left and the Virgin Mary on the right. Both are dressed in white robes and occupy what appear to be the opposite ends of the same room. Gabriel and Mary's panels are separated by two much narrower images showing unoccupied domestic interior scenes. The back wall in the left-hand image has a window opening onto a view of the street and city square, while that in the right-hand image has a niche. Some art historians have attempted to associate the street with an actual location in Ghent, but it is generally accepted that it is not modelled on any specific place. The sparseness of these narrow panels seems anomalous in the overall context of the altarpiece; a number of art historians have suggested that they were compromises worked out by Jan as he struggled to accommodate his design within the original framework set out by Hubert.

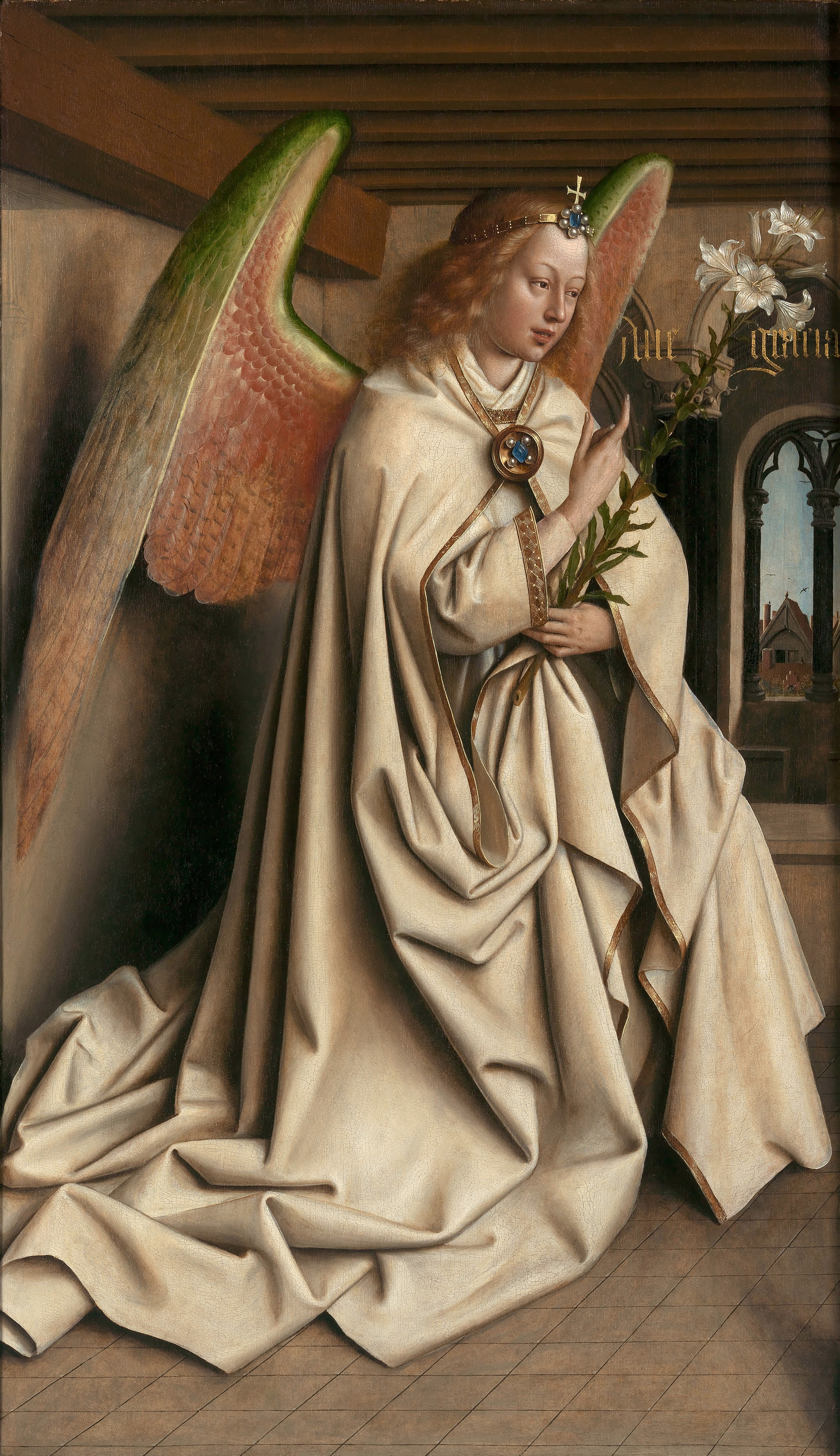
The Archangel Gabriel

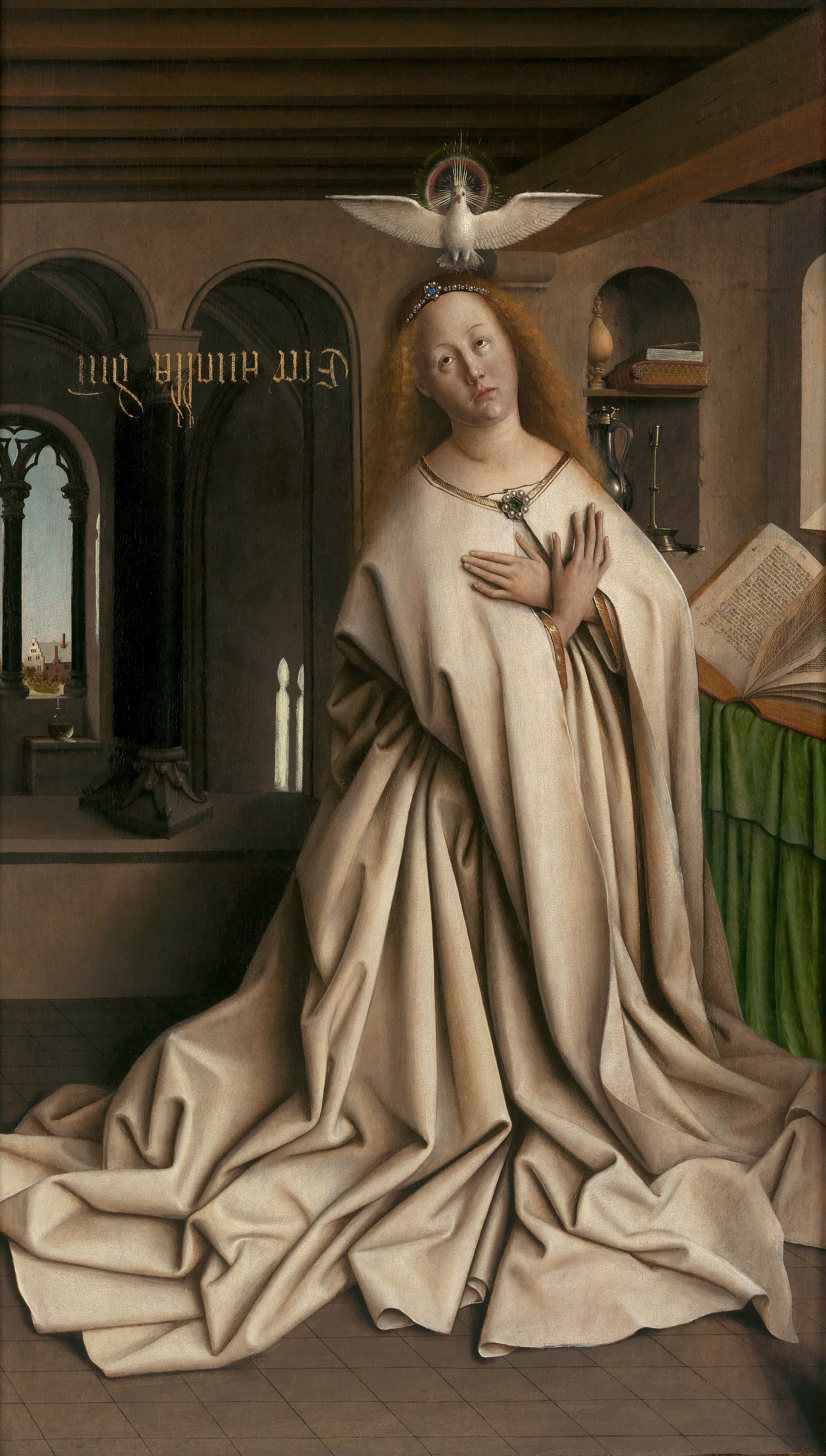
The Virgin Annunciate

Mary and Gabriel are disproportionately large in relation to the scale of the rooms they occupy. Art historians agree that this follows the conventions of both the International Gothic and late Byzantine traditions of the icon by showing saints, especially Mary, in a much larger scale than their surroundings. In this instance their size is probably a device to convey the idea that they are heavenly apparitions who have come momentarily before the donors who are in the lower register. Van Eyck used this conceit most dramatically in his Madonna in the Church (c. 1438–40), which is likely a panel from a dismantled diptych.

Gabriel has blond hair and multicoloured wings. His right hand is raised and in his left he holds lilies, traditionally found in paintings of the annunciation as symbols of Mary's virginity. His words to Mary are written alongside him in Latin: AVE GRACIA PLENA D(OMI)N(U)S TECU(M) ("Hail who art full of grace, the Lord is with you"). The horizontal inscription extends out of the panel and halfway across the neighbouring image. As in van Eyck's Washington Annunciation of c. 1434–6, the letters of Mary's reply are inscribed in reverse and upside-down; as if for God to read from heaven, or for the holy spirit, as represented by the dove, to read as he hovers directly above her. She answers ECCE ANCILLA D(OMI)NI ("Behold the handmaiden of the Lord").

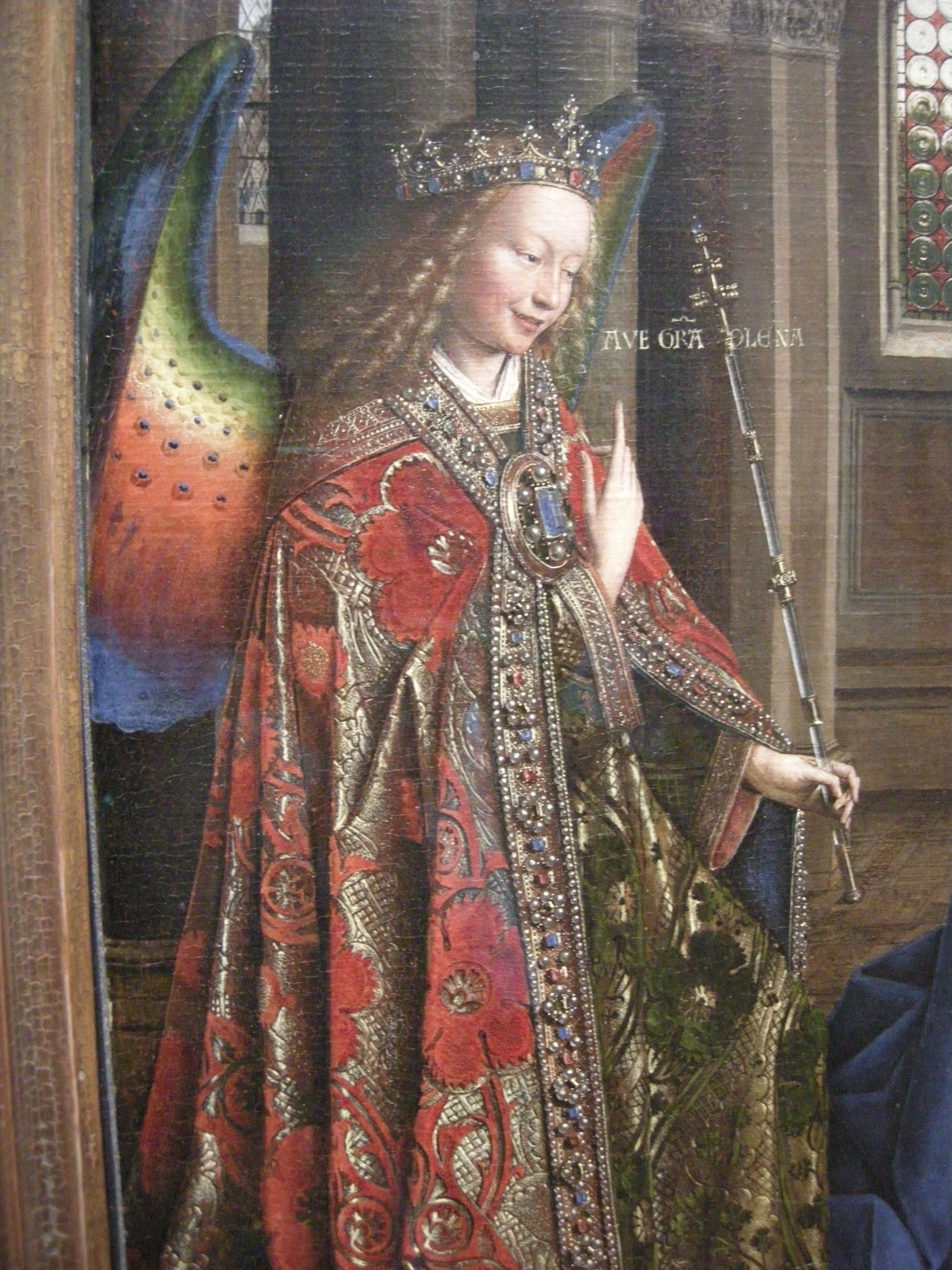
The Archangel Gabriel in a cope with a jewelled morse (clasp) in Jan van Eyck's Annunciation, 1434–36

Art historian Penny Jolly suggests that in the mid to late 1420s Jan may have traveled to Italy at the behest of the Duke of Burgundy where, in Florence, he probably saw an iconic 14th-century annunciation, and perhaps visited more contemporary annunciation scenes. The Florentine annunciations have a number of iconographic similarities to the Ghent panels, including Gabriel's multi-colored wings, the upside-down writing, the treatment of light beams, and the separation between angel and virgin by a thin architectural feature. Some of these elements, particularly the spatial separation between the two figures, can be found in Lorenzo Monaco's Bartolini Salimbeni Annunciation in Santa Trinita, finished before his death in 1424, and one that Jan may have seen. In Monaco's painting the angel and Mary are separated by two small spaces, one external and one internal, similar to the city-scape and domestic lavabo panels in the Ghent annunciation.

The style of the furnishings of the room and the modernity of the town visible through the arched window set the panels in a contemporary 15th century setting. The interiors have been cited as one of the first representations of medieval "bourgeois domestic culture". Borchert sees this familiar setting as a device to allow 15th-century viewers to connect with the panel and so reinforce the conceit that the two saints are apparitions occupying the same space and time as the donor or observer. Yet a number of features in the interior suggest that it is not a secular domestic space, most obviously the cool and austere surfaces, the domed windows, and the stone columns.

The four panels are most obviously connected by the floor tiling and vanishing point. Shadows falling on the tiling at the lower right-hand corner of each panel can only have been cast by the moulding on the frames, that is, from an area outside of the pictorial space.

=== Saints and donors ===
The figures in the panels on the lower register are positioned within uniform niches. The outer panels show the donors Joost Vijdt and his wife Lysbette Borluut, kneeling and gazing into the distance with their hands clasped together in veneration. The inner panels contain paintings of Saint John the Baptist and Saint John the Evangelist. They are rendered in grisaille giving the illusion of sculpture. As with most of the other panels on these wings, they are lit from the right. Shadows thrown by the figures establish depth and bring realism to both the faux statues and their painted niches.

Each saint stands on a stone plinth inscribed with his name. John the Baptist, the son of the priest Zechariah (not to be confused with the prophet of the same name shown on the upper register), holds a lamb in his left arm and is turned towards Joost Vijdt. His right hand is raised and his finger extended to point towards the lamb, a gesture that implies that he is reciting the Agnus Dei. John the Evangelist holds a chalice, a reference to the early medieval tradition that he had ability with cures; he could drink poison from a cup without ill effects.

The donors are painted life-size, and thus to a much larger scale than the saints; this is most noticeable in the relative sizes of their heads and hands. Their bright and warmly coloured clothes contrast sharply with the grey of the lifeless saints. Van Eyck brings a high degree of realism to his portrayal of the Vijdts; his study of the ailing couple in old age is unflinching and far from flattering. Details that reveal their ageing include Joost's watering eyes, wrinkled hands, warts, bald head and stubble streaked with grey. The folds of both figures' skin are meticulously detailed, as are their protruding veins and fingernails. (Note: The panels resemble passages from van Eyck's c 1436 Virgin and Child with Canon van der Paele, and the manner of depicting the aged in such a way is characteristic of a number of works produced by the workshop after his death. See Borchert (2011), 30) They are generally thought to be among the final panels completed for the altarpiece and are so dated to 1431 or the early months of 1432.

== History ==
=== Commission ===
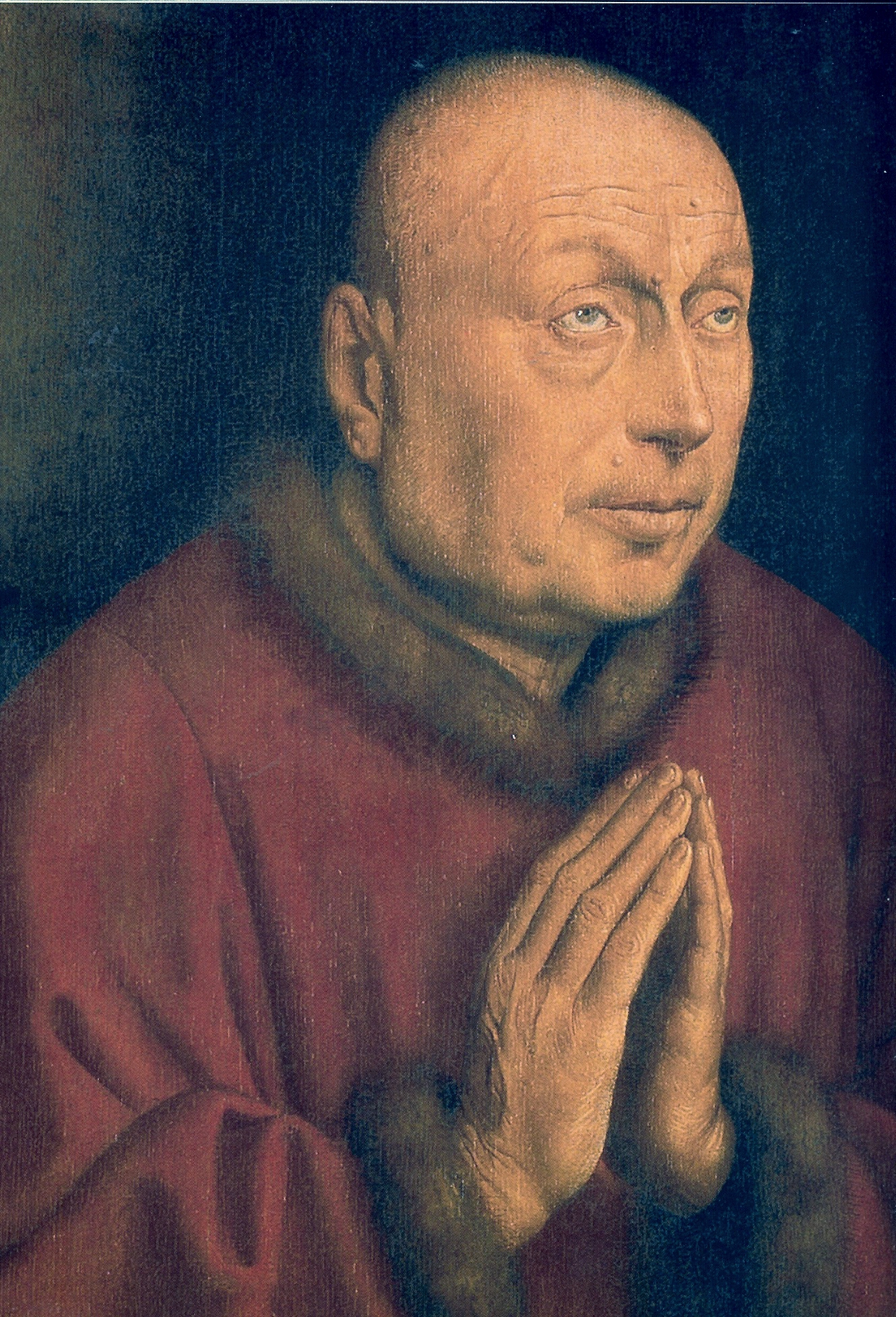
Jodocus Vijd (d. 1439)

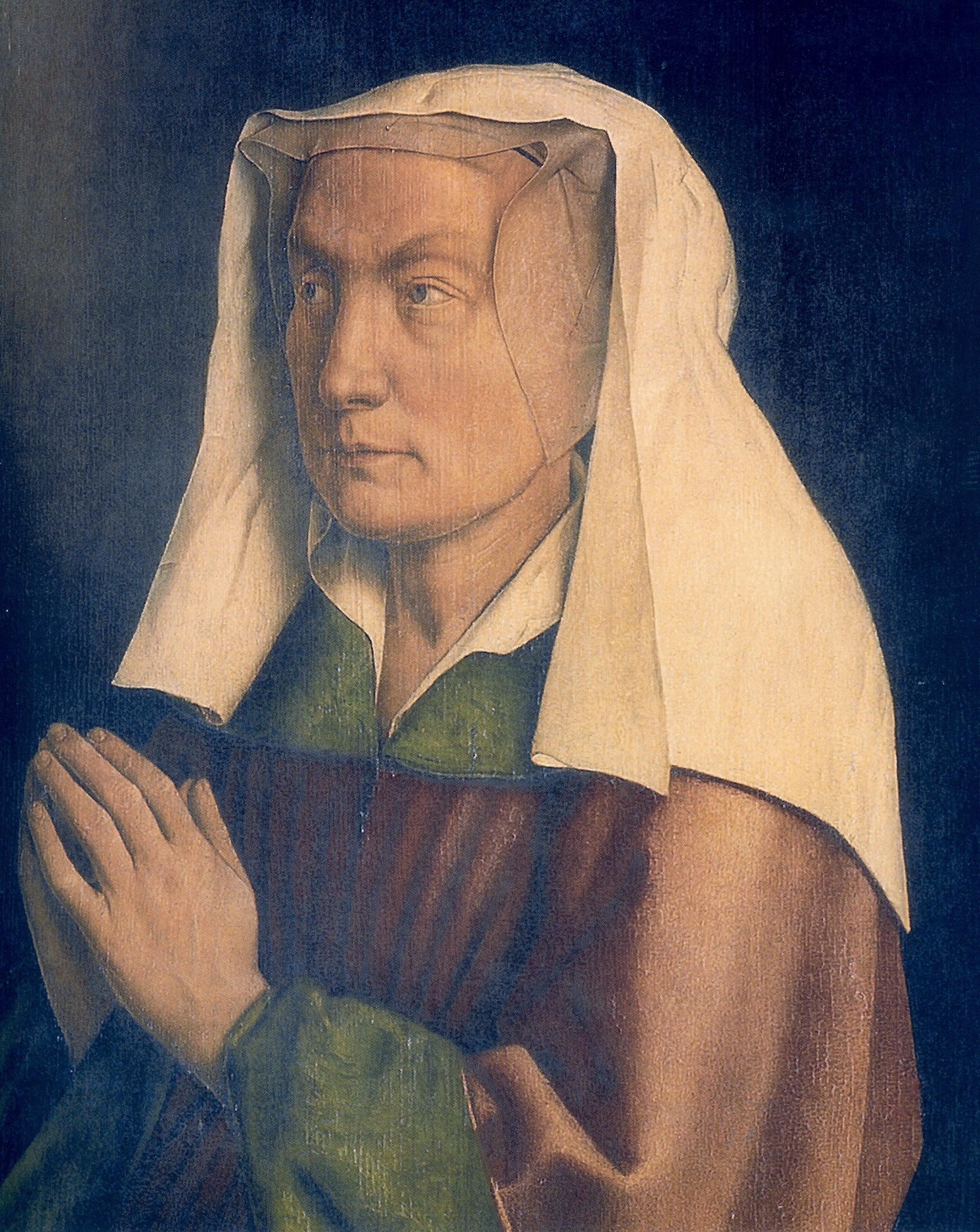
Lysbette Borluut (d. 1443)

Jodocus (known as Joos) Vijd was a wealthy merchant and came from a family that had been influential in Ghent for several generations. His father, Vijd Nikolaas (d. 1412), had been close to Louis II of Flanders. Jodocus was one of the most senior and politically powerful citizens of Ghent. He was titled Seigneur of Pamele and Ledeberg, and in a difficult and rebellious political climate, became one of the Duke of Burgundy Philip the Good's most trusted local councilmen. Around 1398 Jodocus married Lysbette Borluut, also from an established city family.

The couple died childless. Their endowment to the church and the commissioning of the unprecedentedly monumental altarpiece was primarily intended to secure a legacy. But, according to Borchert, also to "secure his position in the hereafter" and, important to such an ambitious politician, demonstrate his social prestige, revealing, according to Borchert, a desire to "show off and ... outstrip by far all other endowments to St John's, if not each and every other church and monastery in Ghent."

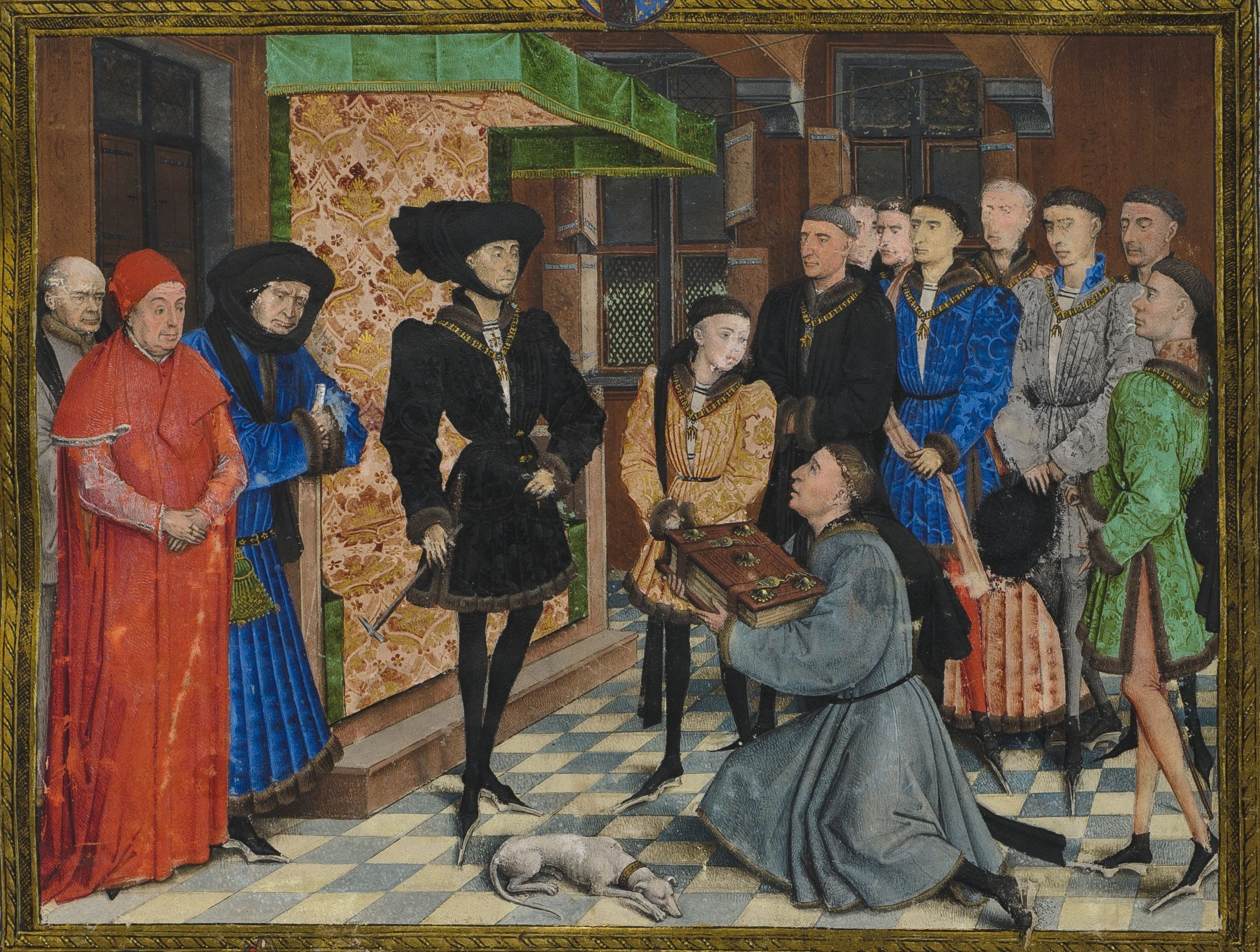
Philip the Good presented with a History of Hainault, flanked by his son Charles and his chancellor Nicolas Rolin. Rogier van der Weyden miniature c. 1447–48.

Ghent prospered through the early 15th century, and a number of local councillors sought to establish a sense of independence from Burgundian rule. Philip was in financial difficulty and asked the city for revenue, a burden many city councillors felt unreasonable and could ill afford, financially or politically. The situation became tense, and because there was division within the council over the burden, this led to a mistrust that meant council membership was dangerous and precarious. During a power play in 1432, a number of councillors were murdered, seemingly for their loyalty to Philip. Tensions came to with head in a 1433 revolt, which ended with the beheading of the councillors who had acted as ringleaders.

Throughout Vijd stayed loyal to Philip. His position as warden at St. John the Baptist's church (now Saint Bavo Cathedral) reflects this; the church was favoured by the Burgundians for official ceremonies held in Ghent. On the day of the altarpiece's consecration, 6 May 1432, Philip's and Isabella of Portugal's son was baptised there, indicating Vijd's status at the time.

As warden (kerkmeester) of St. John's, Vijd between 1410 and 1420 not only financed the construction of the principal chapel's bay, but endowed a new chapel near the choir, which took his family name and was regularly to hold masses in his and his ancestors' memory. It was for this new chapel that he commissioned Hubert van Eyck to create an unusually large and complex polyptych altarpiece. He was recorded as a donor on an inscription on the original, but now lost, frame. The chapel was dedicated to St. John the Baptist, whose traditional attribute is the Lamb of God, a symbol of Christ.

=== First major restoration ===
The first significant restoration was carried out in 1550 by the painters Lancelot Blondeel and Jan van Scorel, following the earlier and poorly executed cleaning by Jan van Scorel, that led to damage to the predella. The 1550 undertaking was performed with a care and reverence that a contemporary account writes of "such love that they kissed that skilful work in art in many places". The predella was destroyed by fire in the 16th century. Comprising a strip of small square panels and executed in water based paints, it showed hell or limbo with Christ arriving to redeem those about to be saved. During the Protestant Reformation the piece was moved out of the chapel to prevent damage in the Beeldenstorm, first to the attic and later to the town hall, where it remained for two decades. In 1662 the Ghent painter Antoon van den Heuvel was commissioned to clean the Ghent Altarpiece.

=== Later history ===
The altarpiece has been moved several times over the centuries. Art historian Noah Charney describes the altarpiece as one of the more coveted and desired pieces of art, the victim of 13 crimes since its installation, and seven thefts. After the French Revolution the altarpiece was among a number of art works plundered in today's Belgium and taken to Paris where they were exhibited at the Louvre. It was returned to Ghent in 1815 after the French defeat at the Battle of Waterloo.

The painting's wings (not including the Adam and Eve panels) were pawned in 1815 by the Diocese of Ghent for the equivalent of £240. When the diocese failed to redeem them, many of them were sold by the dealer Nieuwenhuys in 1816 to the English collector Edward Solly for £4,000 in Berlin. They were sold in 1821 to the King of Prussia, Frederick William III for £16,000, an enormous sum at the time and the highest for a painting at the time and for many decades they were exhibited in the Gemäldegalerie, Berlin. The panels still in Ghent were damaged by fire in 1822, and the separately hinged Adam and Eve panels sent to a museum in Brussels.

During World War I, other panels were taken from the cathedral by German forces. Under the terms of the Treaty of Versailles and its subsequent reparations transfers, in 1920 Germany returned the pilfered panels, along with the original panels that had been legitimately bought by Solly, to help compensate for other German "acts of destruction" during the war. The Germans "bitterly resented the loss of the panels". In 1934, The Just Judges and Saint John the Baptist panels were stolen. The panel of Saint John the Baptist was returned by the thief as a goodwill gesture, but the Just Judges panel is still missing. Albert Camus in The Fall imagines it is kept by the protagonist, Clamence, in his Amsterdam apartment.

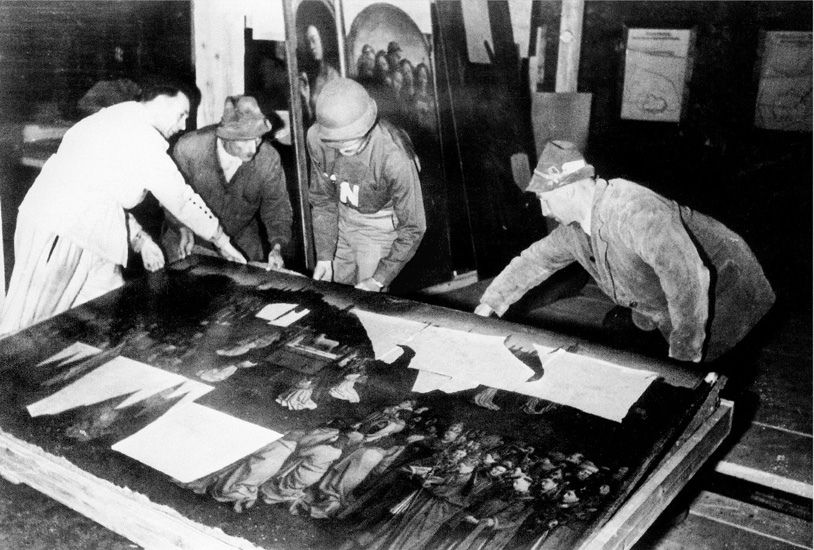
The Ghent Altarpiece during recovery from the Altaussee salt mine at the end of World War II

In 1940, at the start of another invasion by Germany, a decision was made in Belgium to send the altarpiece to the Vatican to keep it safe during World War II. The painting was en route to the Vatican, but still in France, when Italy declared war as an Axis power alongside Germany. The painting was stored in a museum in Pau for the duration of the war, with French, Belgian and German military representatives signing an agreement which required the consent of all three before the masterpiece could be moved. In 1942, Adolf Hitler ordered the painting to be seized and brought to Germany to be stored in the Schloss Neuschwanstein in Bavaria. The seizure, led by senior museum administrator Ernst Buchner and aided by officials in France, was ostensibly to protect the altarpiece from war. After Allied air raids made the castle too dangerous for the painting, it was stored in the Altaussee salt mines, which greatly damaged the paint and varnish. Belgian and French authorities protested the seizing of the painting, and the head of the German army's Art Protection Unit was dismissed after he disagreed with the seizure. Following the war, in 1945, the altarpiece was recovered by the Allied group Monuments, Fine Arts, and Archives program (Note: The story of the recovery of the altarpiece, and many other great works, was at the heart of the 2014 film The Monuments Men.) and returned to Belgium in a ceremony presided over by Belgian royalty at the Royal Palace of Brussels, where the 17 panels were displayed for the press. French officials were not invited as the Vichy government had allowed the Germans to remove the painting.

The Belgian art restorer Jef Van der Veken produced a copy of 'The Just Judges', as part of an overall restoration effort.

In addition to war damage, the panels were threatened during outbreaks of iconoclasm, and have suffered fire damage.

=== Restorations ===
Another restoration began in 1950–51, due to damage sustained during the altarpiece's stay in the Austrian mines during WWII. In this period, newly developed restoration technology, such as x-ray, was applied to the panels.

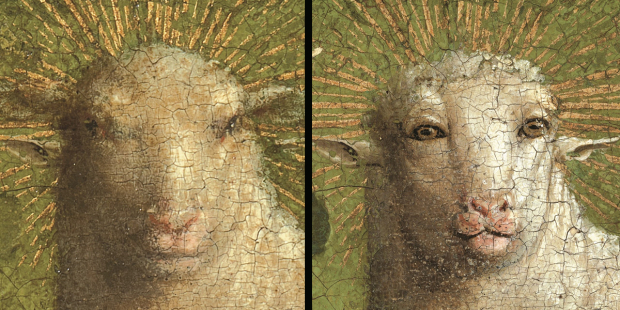
The Lamb of God, before and after restoration

A program of restoration at the Museum of Fine Arts, Ghent began in October 2012. With a budget of €2.2 million, the project was carried out by the Royal Institute for Cultural Heritage (KIK-IRPA). Only the panels being worked on were in the museum at any one time, with the others remained on display in the cathedral. At the museum the public could see the work in progress from behind a glass screen.

The eight outer panels were restored between 2012 and 2016; some 70% of the outer panels' surface had been overpainted in the 16th century, a subtle discovery made possible by advances in imaging techniques during the 2010s. Mathematician Ingrid Daubechies and a group of collaborators developed new mathematical techniques to both reverse the effects of aging and untangle and remove the effects of past ill-fated conservation efforts. Using highly precise photographs and X-rays of the panels as well as various filtering methods, the team of mathematicians found a way to automatically detect the cracks caused by aging. They were able to decipher the apparent text of the polyptych, which was attributed to Thomas Aquinas.

Restoration of the five lower panels took three years, was completed in January 2020, and they were returned to St Bavo's Cathedral. The uncovering of the original face of the Lamb of God was a notable change; the original Lamb has unusually humanoid features, with forward-facing eyes that appear to look directly at the viewer of the panel.

== See also ==
- List of works by Jan van Eyck

== Sources ==
- Ainsworth, Maryan Wynn. From Van Eyck to Bruegel: Early Netherlandish painting in the Metropolitan Museum of Art. New York: Metropolitan Museum of Art, 1999. ISBN 978-0-3000-8609-6
- Borchert, Till-Holger. Van Eyck. London: Taschen, 2008. ISBN 3-8228-5687-8
- Borchert, Till-Holger. Van Eyck to Durer: The Influence of Early Netherlandish painting on European Art, 1430–1530. London: Thames & Hudson, 2011. ISBN 978-0-5210-8831-2
- Boorman, Stanley (ed). Studies in the Performance of Late Medieval Music. Cambridge: Cambridge University Press, 1983. ISBN 0-521-08831-3
- Burroughs, Bryson. "A Diptych by Hubert van Eyck". The Metropolitan Museum of Art Bulletin, Volume 28, No. 11, Pt 1, 1933
- Campbell, Lorne. The Fifteenth-Century Netherlandish Schools. London, National Gallery, 1998. ISBN 978-0-3000-7701-8
- Charney, Noah. Stealing the Mystic Lamb. New York: Public Affairs. 2010. ISBN 978-1586-48800-0
- Clark, Kenneth. The Nude: A Study in Ideal Form. Princeton University Press, 1972. ISBN 978-0691-01788-4
- Deam, Lisa. "Flemish versus Netherlandish: A Discourse of Nationalism". Renaissance Quarterly, Volume 51, No. 1, Spring 1998
- Deneffe, Dominique & Jeroen Reyniers, The Ghent Altarpiece. A Bibliography Archived 2021-10-21 at the Wayback Machine, Contributions to the Study of the Flemish Primitives, 15, Brussels, 2019, 96p.ISBN 978-2-930054-39-1
- Dhanens, Elisabeth. Hubert and Jan van Eyck. New York: Tabard Press. 1980. ISBN 978-0-9144-2700-1
- Hammer, Karl. Secret of the sacred panel. London: Stacey International, 2010. ISBN 978-1-9067-6845-4
- Harbison, Craig. "The Art of the Northern Renaissance". London: Laurence King Publishing, 1995. ISBN 978-1-78067-027-0
- Homa, Ramsay. "Jan van Eyck and the Ghent Altar-Piece". The Burlington Magazine, Volume 116, No. 855, 1974
- Honour, Hugh; Fleming, John. "A World History of Art". London: Laurence King Publishing, 2005. ISBN 1-85669-451-8
- Jolly, Penny. "Jan van Eyck's Italian Pilgrimage: A Miraculous Florentine Annunciation and the Ghent Altarpiece". Zeitschrift für Kunstgeschichte. 61. Bd., H. 3, 1998
- Kurtz, Michael. America and the Return of Nazi Contraband. Cambridge: Cambridge University Press, 2004. ISBN 978-0-521-84982-1
- Lane, Barbara. The Altar and the Altarpiece, Sacramental Themes in Early Netherlandish Painting. London: Harper & Row, 1984. ISBN 978-0-0643-0133-6
- McNamee, W. B. "The Origin of the Vested Angel as a Eucharistic Symbol in Flemish Painting". The Art Bulletin, Volume 53, No. 3, 1972
- Meiss, Millard. "'Nicholas Albergati' and the Chronology of Jan van Eyck's Portraits". The Burlington Magazine, Volume 94, No. 590, 1952
- Nash, Susie. Northern Renaissance art. Oxford: Oxford University Press, 2008. ISBN 978-0-1928-4269-5
- Pächt, Otto. Van Eyck and the Founders of Early Netherlandish Painting. 1999. London: Harvey Miller Publishers. ISBN 978-1-8725-0128-4
- Reitlinger, Gerald. The Economics of Taste, Vol I: The Rise and Fall of Picture Prices 1760–1960. London: Barrie and Rockliffe, 1961
- Ridderbos, Bernhard; van Buren, Anne; van Veen, Henk. Early Netherlandish paintings: Rediscovery, Reception and Research. Amsterdam: Amsterdam University Press, 2004. ISBN 90-5356-614-7
- Schmidt, Peter. Het Lam Gods. Leuven: Uitgeverij Davidsfonds, 2005. ISBN 90-77942-03-3
- Seidel, Linda. "The Value of Verisimilitude in the Art of Jan van Eyck". Yale French Studies: Special Issue: "Contexts: Style and Values in Medieval Art and Literature", 1991
- Snyder, James. "Jan van Eyck and Adam's Apple". The Art Bulletin, Volume 58, No. 4, 1976
- Voll, Karl. Die Altniederländische Malerei von Jan van Eyck bis Memling. Poeschel & Kippenberg, 1906
- Wolff, Martha; Hand, John Oliver. Early Netherlandish painting. National Gallery of Art Washington; Oxford University Press, 1987. ISBN 978-0-5213-4016-8
