= Till-Holger Borchert =

German art historian and writer

Till-Holger Borchert (born 4 January 1967, in Hamburg) is a German art historian and writer specialising in 14th and 15th-century art. He has been the chief curator of the Groeningemuseum and Arentshuis museums in Bruges, Belgium, between 2003 and 2014. In December 2014, he was appointed as director of the Municipal Museums in Bruges. In this role he initiated a radical reorganisation of the institution and laid the foundation for the renewal of infrastructure like the ticketing facility of the Gruuthusemuseum, a new storage, and the exhibition park BRUSK designed by architect Paul Robbrecht. In November 2021 he was appointed as new director of the Suermondt Ludwig Museum in Aachen, a position he resumed in April 2022.

He has been teaching in Europe and the US and curated a number of major exhibitions, including "Memling's Portraits", which showed in Bruges, at the Frick Collection in New York and the Thyssen-Bornemisza Museum in Madrid, and "Memling: Rinascimento fiammingo" in Rome in 2014/15. He was also one of the leading curators of the Bruges Triennial for contemporary art and architecture and has been co-curator of the exhibition "Van Eyck An Optical Revolution" in the Museum of Fine Arts, Ghent in 2020.

== Publications ==
- Van Eyck to Dürer: The Influence of Early Netherlandish Painting on European Art, 1430–1530. Thames & Hudson, 2011
- Splendour of the Burgundian Court: Charles the Bold (1433–1477) (ed). Cornell University Press, 2009
- Jan Van Eyck. Taschen, 2008 (2nd edition 2020)
- Memling's Portraits (ed). Thames & Hudson, 2005
- The Age of Van Eyck: The Mediterranean World and Early Netherlandish Painting 1430–1530. Thames & Hudson, 2002
- The Book of Miracles, with Joshua P. Waterman, Taschen, 2013.
- Masterpieces in Detail: Early Netherlandish Painting from Van Eyck to Bosch, Prestel, 2014
- Bosch in Detail, Ludion, 2016
- Dürer in Detail, Ludion, 2020
- Van Eyck: An Optical Revolution, Hannibal, 2020 (co-editor with Maximiliaan P.J. Martens and Jan Dumolyn)
