= Madonna in the Church =

Small oil panel by Jan van Eyck

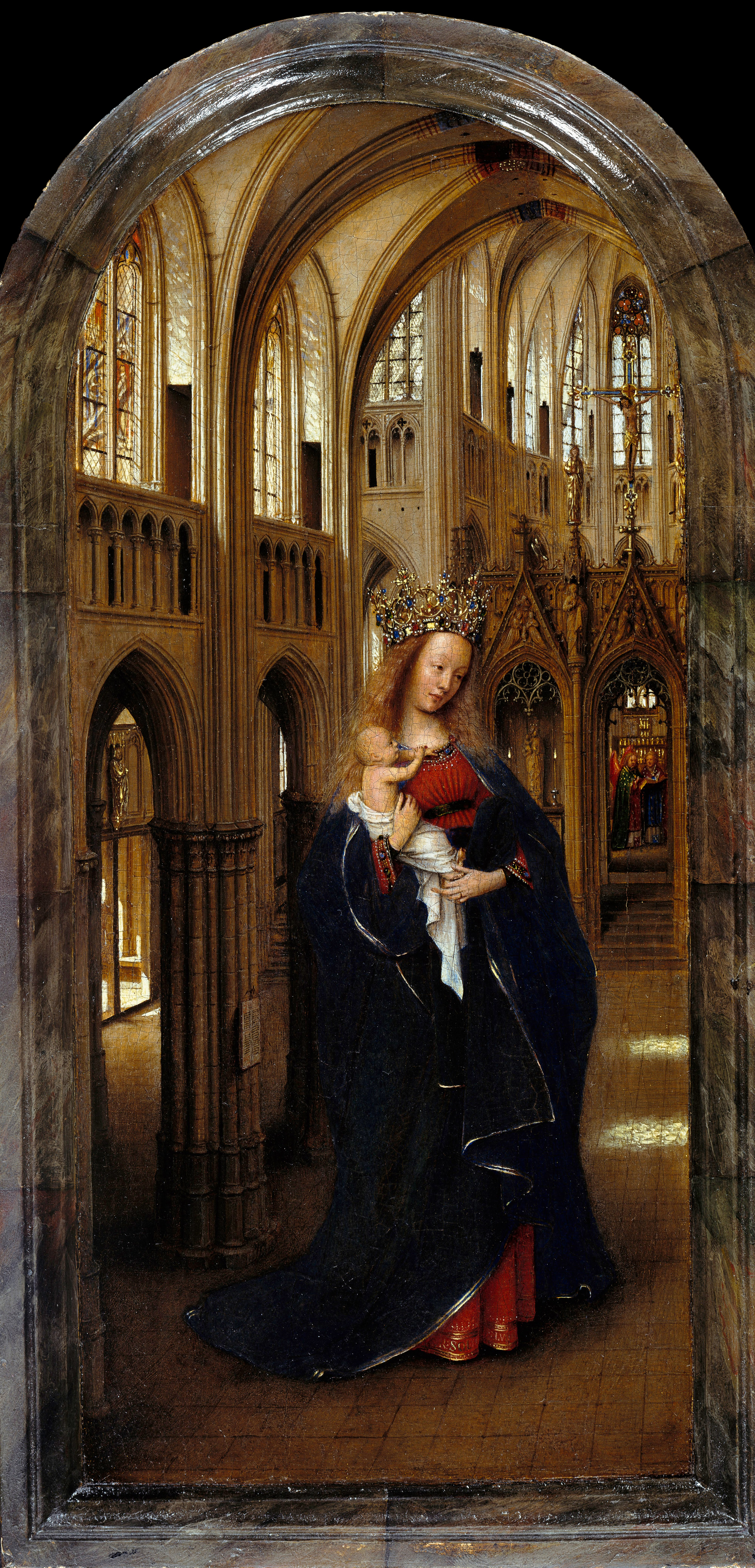
Jan van Eyck, Madonna in the Church (c. 1438–1440). Oil on oak panel, 31 cm × 14 cm (12 in × 5.5 in). Gemäldegalerie, Berlin

Madonna in the Church (or The Virgin in the Church) is a small panel painting by the early Netherlandish painter Jan van Eyck. Probably executed between c. 1438–1440, it depicts the Virgin Mary holding the Child Jesus in a Gothic cathedral. Mary is presented as Queen of Heaven wearing a jewel-studded crown, cradling a playful child Christ who gazes at her and grips the neckline of her red dress in a manner that recalls the 13th-century Byzantine tradition of the Eleusa icon (Virgin of Tenderness). Tracery in the arch at the rear of the nave contains wooden carvings depicting episodes from Mary's life, while a faux bois sculpture in a niche shows her holding the child in a similar pose. Erwin Panofsky sees the painting composed as if the main figures in the panel are intended to be the sculptures come to life. In a doorway to the right, two angels sing psalms from a hymn book. Like other Byzantine depictions of the Madonna, van Eyck depicts a monumental Mary, unrealistically large compared to her surroundings. The panel contains closely observed beams of light flooding through the cathedral's windows. It illuminates the interior before culminating in two pools on the floor. The light has symbolic significance, alluding simultaneously to Mary's virginal purity and God's ethereal presence.

Most art historians see the panel as the left wing of a dismantled diptych; presumably its opposite wing was a votive portrait. Near-contemporary copies by the Master of 1499 and Jan Gossaert pair it with two very different right-hand images: one is of a donor kneeling in an interior setting; the other is set outdoors, with the donor being presented by St Anthony. Both painters made significant alterations to van Eyck's composition, which may have brought the image more up to date with contemporary styles, but the copies have been described as "spiritually if not aesthetically disastrous to the original concept".

Madonna in the Church was first documented in 1851. Since then its dating and attribution have been widely debated amongst scholars. At first thought an early work by Jan van Eyck, and for a period attributed to his brother Hubert van Eyck, it is now definitively attributed to Jan and believed to be a later work, demonstrating techniques present in work from the mid-1430s and later. The panel was acquired for the Berlin Gemäldegalerie in 1874. It was stolen in 1877 and soon returned, but without its original inscribed frame, which was never recovered. Today Madonna in the Church is widely considered one of van Eyck's finest; Millard Meiss wrote that its "splendor and subtlety of [its depiction] of light is unsurpassed in Western art."

== Attribution and dating ==
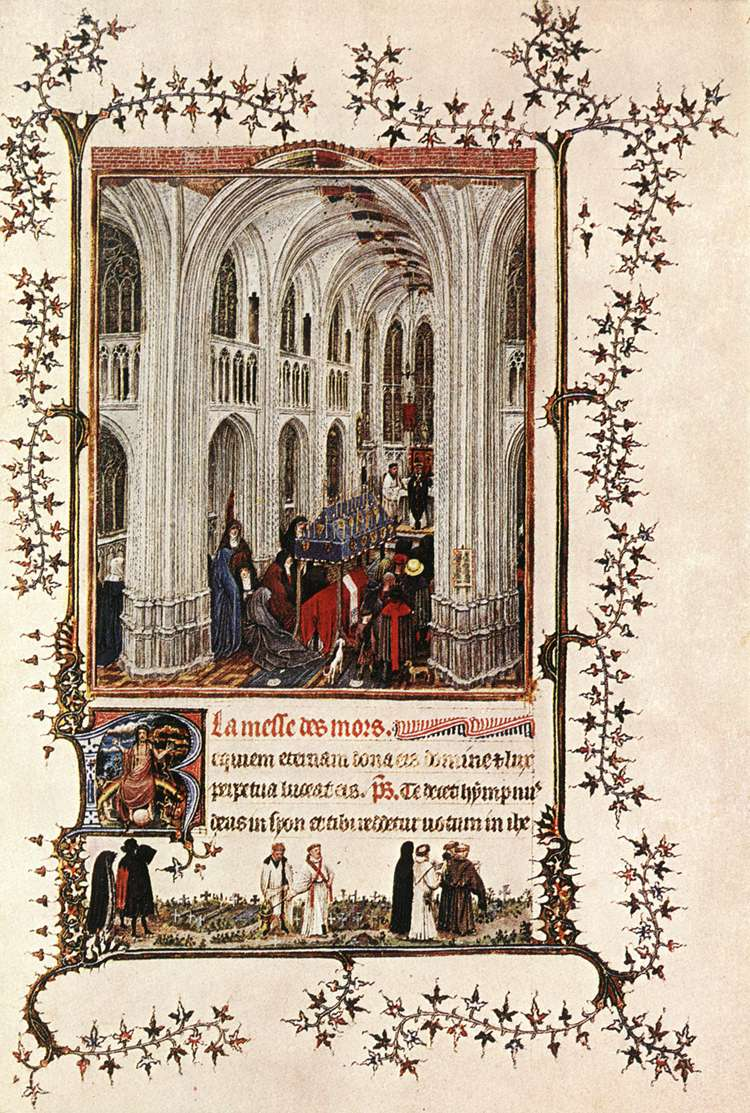
Mass of the Dead. From the Turin-Milan Hours, attributed to the anonymous Hand G, thought to be van Eyck. This work shows a very similar gothic interior to the Berlin panel.

The attribution of the panel reflects the progression and trends of 19th and 20th-century scholarship on Early Netherlandish art. It is now thought to have been completed c. 1438–1440, but there are still arguments for dates as early as 1424–1429. As with the pages ascribed to Hand G in the Turin-Milan Hours manuscript, the panel was attributed to Jan's brother Hubert van Eyck in the 1875 Gemäldegalerie catalogue, and by a 1911 claim by art historian Georges Hulin de Loo. This is no longer considered credible and Hubert, today, is credited with very few works. By 1912 the painting had been definitively attributed to Jan in the museum catalogue.

Attempts to date it have undergone similar shifts of opinion. In the 19th century the panel was believed to be an early work by Jan completed as early as c. 1410, although this view changed as scholarship progressed. In the early 20th century, Ludwig von Baldass placed it around 1424–1429, then for a long period it was seen as originating from the early 1430s. Erwin Panofsky provided the first detailed treatise on the work and placed it around 1432–34. However, following research from Meyer Schapiro, he revised his opinion to the late 1430s in the 1953 edition of his Early Netherlandish Painting. A 1970s comparative study of van Eyck's 1437 Saint Barbara concluded that Madonna in the Church was completed after c. 1437. In the 1990s, Otto Pächt judged the work as probably a late van Eyck, given the similar treatment of an interior in the 1434 Arnolfini Portrait. In the early 21st century, Jeffrey Chipps Smith and John Oliver Hand placed it between 1426 and 1428, claiming it as perhaps the earliest extant signed work confirmed as by Jan.

== The panel ==
=== Description ===
At 31 cm × 14 cm, the painting's dimensions are small enough to be almost considered miniature, consistent with most 15th-century devotional diptychs. A reduced size increased portability and affordability, and encouraged the viewer to approach the piece to more closely see its intricate details. The work shows Mary wearing a dark blue robe – the colour traditionally used to emphasise her humanity – over a red dress of different textured fabrics. Her hem is embroidered in gold with gilded lettering that reads "SOL" and "LU", or perhaps SIOR SOLE HEC ES, in all probability, fragments of the Latin words for "sun" (sole) and "light" (lux). On her head is an elaborately tiered and jeweled crown and in her arms she carries the infant Jesus, his feet resting on her left hand. Swaddled in a white cloth from hips trailing down beyond his feet, his hand clutches the jeweled neckline of his mother's dress.

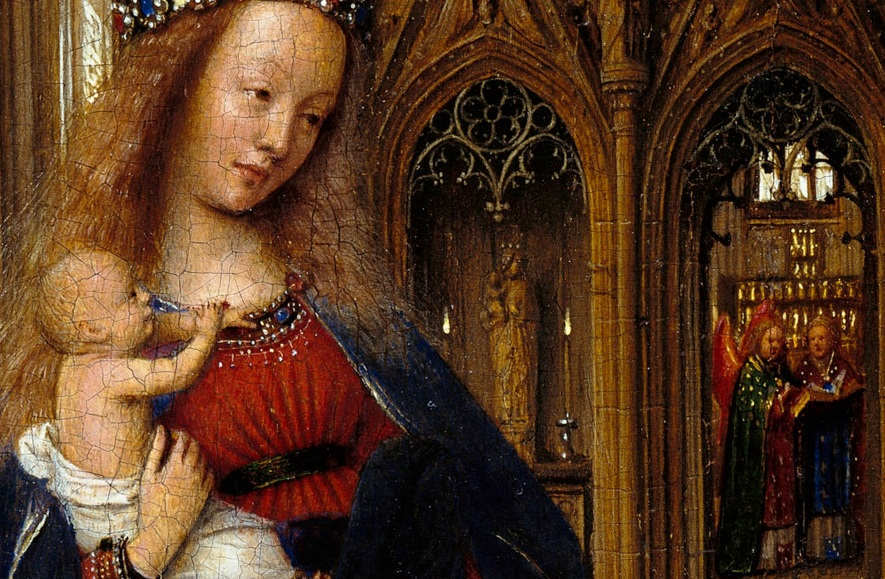
The Madonna and infant Christ (detail). A statue of the Madonna and Child can be seen just behind; to the right two angels sing psalms.

Further depictions of Mary are found in the church background. They include a statue of the Virgin and Child positioned between two lit candles in the choir screen behind the main figures, and to the right two angels stand in the choir singing her praises (perhaps singing the hymn inscribed on the frame). Above her is an annunciation relief, and in the recessed bay a relief depicting her coronation; the crucifixion is shown on the rood. Thus, the stages of Mary's life as mother of Jesus are depicted in the painting. A two-column prayer tablet – similar to the one depicted in Rogier van der Weyden's large Seven Sacraments Altarpiece (1445–1450) – hangs on a pier to the left. It contains words alluding to and echoing the lines on the original frame. The windows of the clerestory overlook flying buttresses, and cobwebs are visible between the arches of the vault. Several different building phases can be seen in the arched gallery, while the choral balcony and transept are depicted in a more contemporary style than the nave.

Closely detailed beams of light spill through the high windows and illuminate the interior, filling the portal and flowing across the tiled floors before it hits the clerestory windows. The brilliance of the daylight is juxtaposed with the gentle glow of the candles in the choir screen altar, while the lower portion of the pictorial space is relatively poorly lit. Shadows cast by the cathedral can be seen across the choir steps and near aisle. Their angle is rendered in an unusually realistic manner for early 15th century, and the detail is such that their description is likely based on observation of the actual behaviour of light, a further innovation in 15th-century art. Yet while the light is portrayed as it might appear in nature, its source is not. Panofsky notes that the sunlight enters from the north windows, but contemporary churches normally had east-facing choirs, so the light should enter from the south. He suggests the light is not intended to be natural, but rather to represent the divine, and hence subject to "the laws of symbolism and not those of nature."

=== Frame and inscriptions ===
According to Elisabeth Dhanens, the shape and rounded top of the original frame is reminiscent of those found on the top register of panels of the Ghent Altarpiece, which are accepted as designed by Jan's brother Hubert. She believes the current frame is too narrow and small, and contains "clumsy marbling". From a detailed 1851 inventory, we know the text of the hymn inscribed on original frame. The text is written in a poetic form and begun on the lower border and then extended upwards on the vertical borders, ending on the top border. The lower border of the frame read FLOS FLORIOLORUM APPELLARIS; the sides and top MATER HEC EST FILIA PATER EST NATUS QUIS AUDIVIT TALIA DEUS HOMO NATUS ETCET ("The mother is the daughter. This father is born. Who has heard of such a thing? God born a man"). The fifth stanza of the hymn (not included in van Eyck's transcription) reads, "As the sunbeam through the glass. Passeth but not staineth. Thus, the Virgin, as she was. Virgin still remaineth." The lettering on the hem of her robe echoes the inscription on the frame, words similar to those found on Mary's dress in van Eyck's 1436 Virgin and Child with Canon van der Paele, a passage from the Book of Wisdom (7:29) reading EST ENIM HAEC SPECIOSIOR SOLE ET SUPER OMNEM STELLARUM DISPOSITIONEM. LUCI CONPARATA INVENITUR PRIOR ("For she is more beautiful than the sun, and excels every constellation of the stars. Compared with the light she is found to be superior").

Some historians have suggested that the inscriptions were intended to breathe life into the other statues and depictions of Mary. Others, including Craig Harbison, believe they were purely functional; given that contemporary diptychs were commissioned for private devotion and reflection, the inscriptions were meant to be read as an incantation or were personalised indulgence prayers. Harbison notes that van Eyck's privately commissioned works are unusually heavily inscribed with prayer, and that the words may have served a similar function to prayer tablets, or more exactly "Prayer Wings", of the type seen in the reconstructed London Virgin and Child triptych.

=== Architecture ===
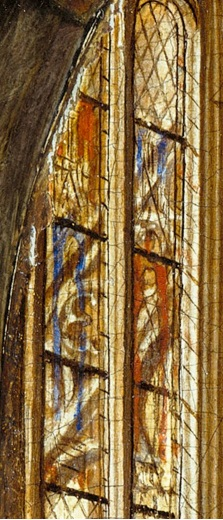
The furthermost stained-glass window at the top left of the panel

Van Eyck's earlier work often shows churches and cathedrals in older Romanesque style, sometimes to represent the Temple in Jerusalem as an appropriate historical setting, with decoration drawn exclusively from the Old Testament. That is clearly not the case here – the Christ Child occupies the same space as a large rood cross depicting him being crucified. The church in this panel is contemporary Gothic – a choice perhaps intended to associate Mary with the Ecclesia Triumphans – while her pose and oversized scale are indebted to the forms and conventions of Byzantine art and the International Gothic. Van Eyck details the architecture with a precision not seen before in northern European painting.

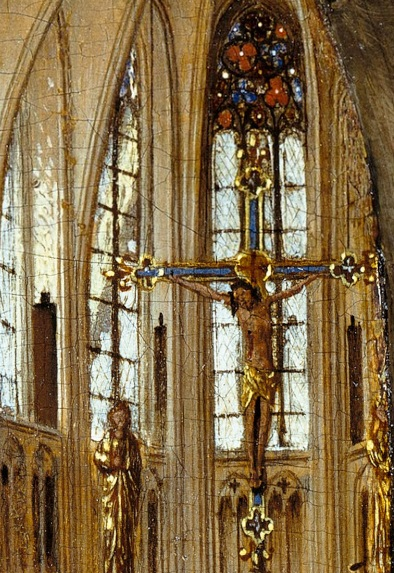
The crucifixion in the upper right portion of the panel

The different elements of the cathedral are so specifically detailed and the elements of Gothic and contemporary architecture so well delineated, that art and architecture historians have concluded that van Eyck must have had enough architectural knowledge to make nuanced distinctions. More so, given the finesse of the descriptions, many scholars have tried to link the painting with a particular building. Yet, and as with all buildings in van Eyck's work, the structure is imagined and probably an idealised formation of what he viewed as a perfect architectural space. This is evident from a number of features that would be unlikely in a contemporary church, such as the placing of a round arched triforium above a pointed colonnade.

Several art historians have reasoned why van Eyck did not model the interior on any actual building. Most agree that he sought to create an ideal and perfect space for Mary's apparition, and aimed for visual impact rather than physical possibility. Buildings suggested as possible (at least partial) sources include Saint Nicholas' Church, Ghent, the Basilica of St Denis, Dijon Cathedral, Liège Cathedral and Cologne Cathedral, as well as the basilica of Our Lady in Tongeren, which contains a very similar triforium gallery and clerestory. Tongeren is one of a minority of churches in the region aligned on a north-east to south-west axis, so that the lighting conditions in the painting can be seen on summer mornings. In addition, the church contains a standing statue of the Virgin and Child (the Virgin with a tall crown), once credited with miraculous powers, though the current statue post-dates van Eyck.

Pächt described the work in terms of an "interior illusion", noting the manner in which the viewer's eye falls across the nave, the crossing, but "only then, [is he] looking through and over the rood screen, the choir." From this Pächt views the perspective as deliberately lacking cohesion, as "the relationship between the parts of the building is not shown in full ... The transition from foreground to background is ingeniously masked by the figure of the Madonna herself, who obscures the crossing pier; the middle ground is practically eliminated and our eye crosses over it without our becoming aware of it." The illusion is enhanced by the use of colour to suggest light: the interior is dim and in shadow while the unseen exterior seems bathed in bright light.

=== Windows and stained glass ===
Unusual for a 13th-century Gothic cathedral, most of the windows are of clear glass. Looking at the windows running along the nave, John L. Ward observed that the window directly above the suspended crucifix is the only one whose uppermost portion is visible. That window directly faces the viewer, revealing intricately designed stained glass panels that show intertwined red and blue flowers. Because the window is so far back in the pictorial space, where perspective is becoming faint, the proximity of the flowers to the crucifix lends them the appearance of coming "forward in space, as if [they] had suddenly grown from the top of the crucifix in front of it."

Ward does not believe this a trick of the eye resulting from loss of perspective towards the high reaches of the panel. Instead he sees it as a subtle reference to the iconography and mythology of the Book of Genesis' Tree of life, which he describes here as "reborn in Christ's death". He does acknowledge the subtlety of the illusion, and the fact that neither of the two well-known near copies include the motif. The idea of flowers shown as if sprouting from the top of the cross may have been borrowed from Masaccio's c. 1426 Crucifixion, where flowers are placed on the upper portion of the vertical beam of the cross. Ward concludes than van Eyck took the idea even further by showing the flowers emanating from another source, and sought to depict the actual moment where the tree of life is reborn and "the cross comes to life and sprouts flowers as one watches".

== Interpretation and iconography ==
=== Light ===
In the early 15th century, Mary held a central position in Christian iconography and was often portrayed as the one in whom the "Word was made flesh", a direct result of the work of the divine light. During the medieval period, light acted as a visual symbol for both the Immaculate Conception and Christ's birth; it was believed that he was made manifest by God's light passing through Mary's body, just as light shines through a window pane.

Annunciation, Jan van Eyck, c 1434. National Gallery of Art, Washington DC. This is perhaps the best known of van Eyck's Madonna paintings where the figures seem overlarge compared with the architecture. However, in this work there are no architectural fittings to give a clear scale to the building.

The divine represented by light is a motif in keeping with the sentiment of both the Latin text on the hem of Mary's dress (which compares her beauty and radiance to that of divine light) and on the frame. A separate source of light, which also behaves as if from a divine rather than natural source, illuminates her face. The two pools of light behind her have been described as lending the painting a mystical atmosphere, indicating the presence of God. In the niche behind her, the statues are lit by two candles - symbols of the incarnation, whereas she is bathed in natural light. The artificial light adds to the overall illusion of the interior of the church, which Pächt views as achieved mainly through colour.

Light became a popular means for 15th-century Northern painters to represent the mystery of the Incarnation, utilising the idea of light passing through glass without shattering it to convey the paradox of conception and "virgo intacta". This is reflected in a passage attributed to Bernard of Clairvaux from his "Sermones de Diversis"; "Just as the brilliance of the sun fills and penetrates a glass window without damaging it, and pierces its solid form with imperceptible subtlety, neither hurting it when entering nor destroying it when emerging: thus the word of God, the splendor of the Father, entered the virgin chamber and then came forth from the closed womb."

Before the early Netherlandish period, divine light was not well described: if a painter wanted to depict heavenly radiance, he typically painted an object in reflective gold. There was a focus on describing the object itself rather than the effect of the light as it fell across it. Van Eyck was one of the first to portray light's saturation, illuminating effects and gradations as it poured across the pictorial space. He detailed how an object's colour could vary depending on the amount and type of light illuminating it. This play of light is evident across the panel, and especially seen on Mary's gilded dress and jewelled crown, across her hair and on her mantle.

=== Eleusa icon ===
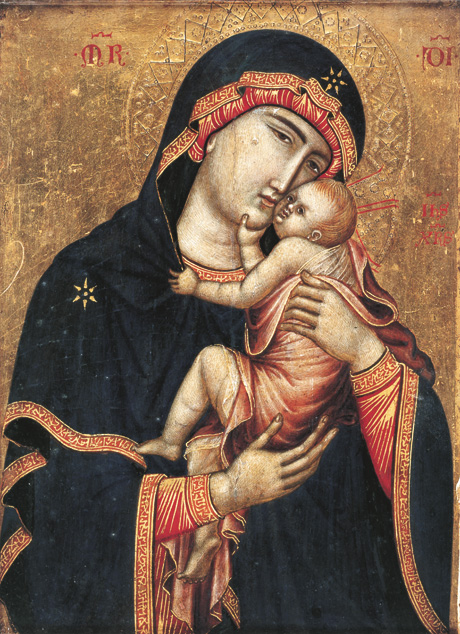
The Cambrai Madonna, (anonymous), c. 1340. Italo-Byzantine, Cambrai Cathedral

The panel is, with the Antwerp Madonna at the Fountain, broadly accepted as one of van Eyck's two late "Madonna and Child" paintings before his death in about 1441. Both show a standing Virgin dressed in blue. In both works, Mary's positioning and colourisation contrasts with his earlier surviving treatments of the subject, in which she was typically seated and dressed in red. Models for standing Virgins existed in the icons of Byzantine art, and both paintings also represent modified versions of the eleusa type, sometimes called the Virgin of Tenderness in English, where the Virgin and Child touch cheeks, and the child caresses Mary's face.

During the 14th and 15th centuries, a large number of these works were imported into northern Europe, and were widely copied by the first generation of Netherlandish artists, among others. The iconography of both the late Byzantine – typified by the unknown artist responsible for the Cambrai Madonna – and 14th-century successors such as Giotto favoured presenting the Madonna on a monumental scale. Undoubtedly van Eyck absorbed these influences, though when and through which works is disputed. It is believed that he had first-hand exposure to them during his visit to Italy, which occurred either in 1426 or 1428, before the Cambrai icon was brought to the North. Van Eyck's two Madonna panels carried forward the habit of reproduction and were themselves frequently copied by commercial workshops throughout the 15th century.

It is possible that the Byzantine flavour to these images was also connected with contemporary attempts through diplomacy to achieve reconciliation with the Greek Orthodox Church, in which van Eyck's patron Philip the Good took a keen interest. Van Eyck's Portrait of Cardinal Niccolò Albergati (c. 1431) depicts one of the papal diplomats most involved with these efforts.

=== Mary as the Church ===
Van Eyck gives Mary three roles: Mother of Christ, the personification of the "Ecclesia Triumphans" and Queen of Heaven, the latter apparent from her jewel-studded crown. The painting's near miniature size contrasts with Mary's unrealistically large stature compared with her setting. She physically dominates the cathedral; her head is almost level with the approximately sixty feet high gallery. This distortion of scale is found in a number of other van Eyck's Madonna paintings, where the arches of the mostly gothic interior do not allow headroom for the virgin. Pächt describes the interior as a "throne room", which envelops her as if a "carrying case". Her monumental stature reflects a tradition reaching back to an Italo-Byzantine type – perhaps best known through Giotto's Ognissanti Madonna (c. 1310) – and emphasises her identification with the cathedral itself. Till-Holger Borchert says that van Eyck did not paint her as "the Madonna in a church", but instead as metaphor, presenting Mary "as the Church". This idea that her size represents her embodiment as the church was first suggested by Erwin Panofsky in 1941. Art historians in the 19th century, who thought the work was executed early in van Eyck's career, attributed her scale as the mistake of a relatively immature painter.

The composition is today seen as deliberate, and opposite to both his Madonna of Chancellor Rolin and Arnolfini Portrait. These works show interiors seemingly too small to contain the figures, a device van Eyck used to create and emphasise an intimate space shared by donor and saint. The Virgin's height recalls his Annunciation of 1434–36, although in that composition there are no architectural fittings to give a clear scale to the building. Perhaps reflecting the view of a "relatively immature painter", a copy of the Annunciation by Joos van Cleve shows Mary at a more realistic proportion scale to her surroundings.

Mary is presented as a Marian apparition; in this case she probably appears before a donor, who would have been kneeling in prayer in the now lost opposite panel. The idea of a saint appearing before laity was common in Northern art of the period, and is also represented in van Eyck's Virgin and Child with Canon van der Paele (1434–1436). There, the Canon is portrayed as if having just momentarily paused to reflect on a passage from his hand-held bible as the Virgin and Child with two saints appear before him, as if embodiments of his prayer.

=== Pilgrimage ===
As a prayer tablet placed on a pier was a distinctive trait of pilgrimage churches, Harbison sees the panel as partly concerned with the phenomenon of pilgrimage. This type of tablet contained specific prayers whose recitation in front of a particular image or in the church was believed to attract an indulgence, or remission of time in Purgatory. The statue of the Virgin and Child in the niche behind Mary's left shoulder might represent such an image, whereas the inscription of a Nativity hymn around the lost frame, ending in ETCET, i.e. "etcetera", would have told the viewer to recite the whole hymn, perhaps for an indulgence. The purpose of the picture, therefore, may have been to represent and bring the act of pilgrimage to a domestic setting. This would have been attractive to Philip the Good who, though he made many pilgrimages in person, is recorded as paying van Eyck to perform one on his behalf in 1426, apparently an acceptable practice in Late Medieval celestial accounting.

The Virgin and Child at the forefront might represent the background statues coming to life; at the time such an apparition was considered the highest form of pilgrimage experience. Their poses are similar and her tall crown is typical of those seen on statues rather than either royalty or painted figures of the Virgin. Harbison further suggests that the two pools of light on the floor echo the two candles on either side of one of the statues, and notes that the copies described below retain the prayer tablet, one bringing it nearer to the foreground.

== Lost diptych and copies ==
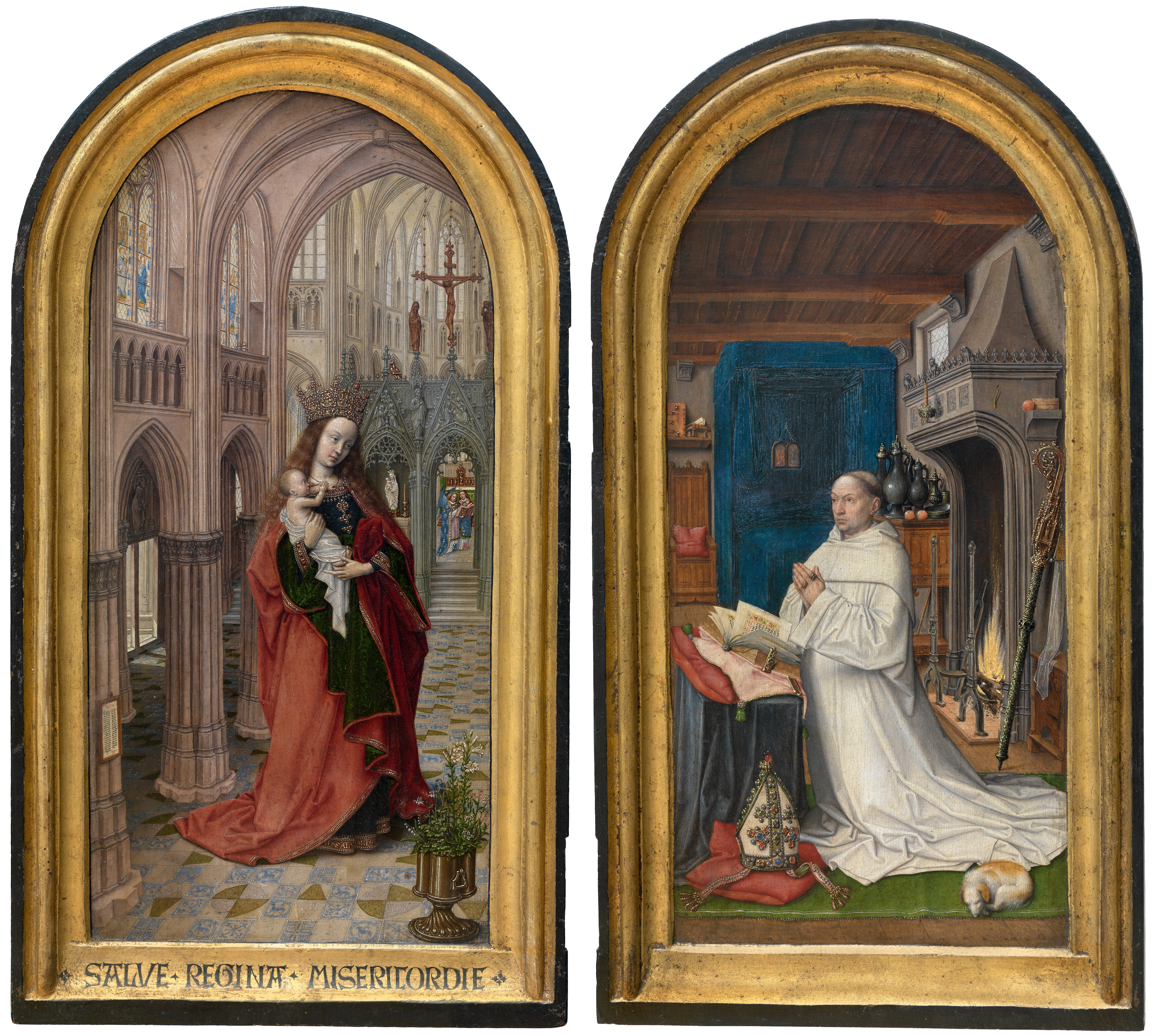
Master of 1499, Madonna and Child with a Portrait of Abbot Christiaan de Hondt. Koninklijk Museum voor Schone Kunsten, Antwerp.

Most art historians believe that there are a number of indicators that the panel was the left-hand wing of a dismantled diptych. The frame contains clasps, implying it was once hinged to a second panel. The work seems composed to be symmetrically balanced towards an accompanying right-hand wing: Mary is positioned slightly to the right of centre, while her downward, almost coy glance is directed at a space beyond the edge of the panel, suggesting that she is looking at, or in the direction of, a kneeling donor in a right-hand wing. The visible architectural features – with the exception of the niches, the crucifixion and the windows directly behind it, which are at a right angle to the nave and centre front, facing the viewer – are at the left of the panel, facing right.

Harbison believes the panel is "almost certainly only the left-hand half of a devotional diptych". Dhanens observes how Mary's eyeline extends beyond the horizon of her panel, a common feature of Netherlandish diptychs and triptychs, where the saint's gaze is directed towards an accompanying image of a donor. Other indicators include the unusually oblique architectural aspect of the church, which suggests that its depiction was intended to extend across to a sister wing – in a manner similar to the Master of Flemalle's Annunciation, and especially in van der Weyden's c. 1452 Braque Triptych, where continuity between the panels is especially emphasised.

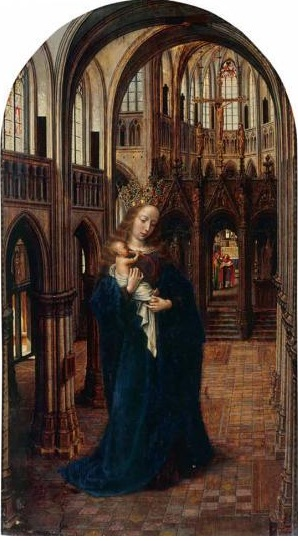
Jan Gossaert ?, Virgin in the Church, c. 1510–1515, Galleria Doria Pamphilj, Rome. This panel has sometimes been attributed to Gerard David.

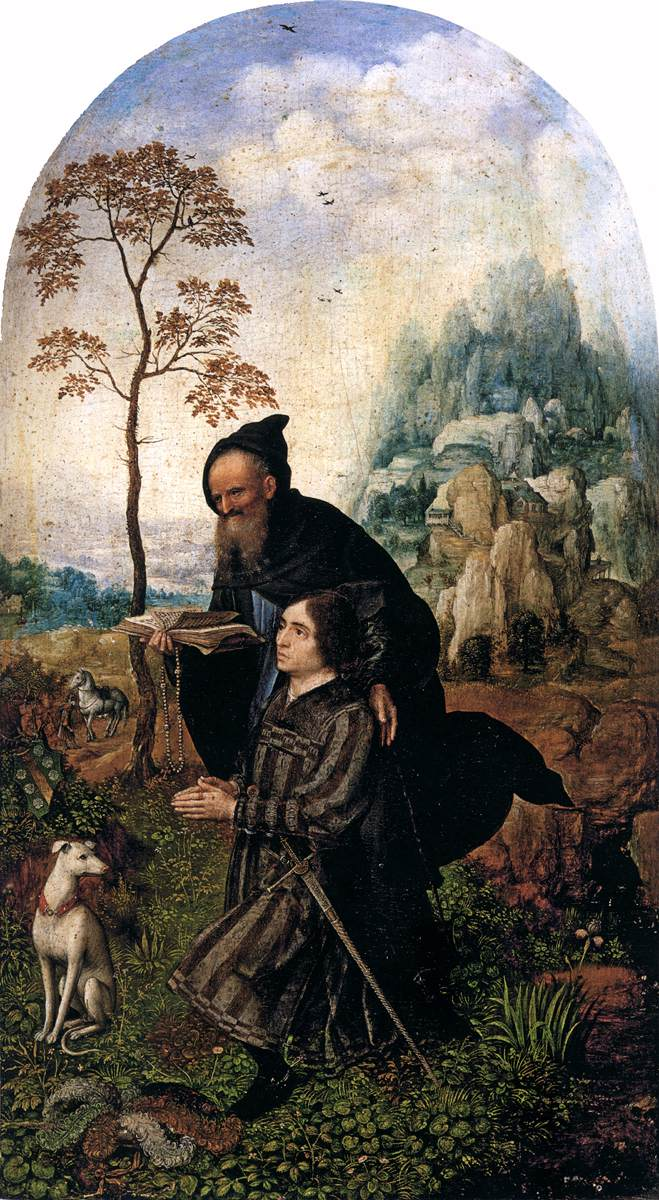
St Anthony with a Donor, c. 1513. Galleria Doria Pamphilj, Rome

Two near-contemporary copies, usually attributed to the Ghent Master of 1499 and Jan Gossaert, were completed while the original was in the collection of Margaret of Austria, great-granddaughter of Philip the Good. Both present variants of the Madonna panel as the left wing of a devotional diptych, with a donor portrait as the right wing. However, the two donor panels have very different settings. The 1499 version shows the Cistercian abbot Christiaan de Hondt praying in his luxurious quarters, while Gossaert presents the donor Antonio Siciliano, accompanied by Saint Anthony, in a panoramic landscape setting. It is not known if either work is based on an original left-hand panel painted by van Eyck.

The 1499 Madonna panel is a free adaption, in that the artist has changed and repositioned a number of elements. However, art historians usually agree that they are to the detriment of the balance and impact of the composition. The panel attributed to Gossaert shows even more significant, though perhaps more successful, alterations, including shifting the centre of balance by adding a section to the right-hand side, dressing the Virgin entirely in dark blue and changing her facial features. Both copies omit the two pools of bright light on the floor across from her, thus removing the mystical element of van Eyck's original, perhaps because its significance was not grasped by the later artists. That Gossaert followed other aspects of the original so closely, however, is evidence of the high regard he held for van Eyck's technical and aesthetic ability, and his version has been seen by some as a homage. The Master of 1499's admiration for van Eyck can be seen in his left-hand panel, which contains many features reminiscent of van Eyck's Arnolfini Portrait, including the rendering of the ceiling beams and the colour and texture of the red fabrics.

Around 1520–1530, the Ghent illuminator and miniaturist Simon Bening produced a half-length Virgin and Child that closely resembles van Eyck's panel, to the extent that it can be considered a loose copy. However, it can be more closely related to the original Cambrai Madonna especially in its retention of the halo, which was considered old fashioned by the 15th century. Bening's Madonna is distinct to the two earlier copies of van Eyck; it was intended as a stand-alone panel, not part of a diptych, and though compositionally similar, radically departs from the original, especially in its colourisation. It is thought that Bening's work was informed by Gossaert's panel rather than directly by van Eyck's.

== Provenance ==
The provenance of the work contains many gaps, and even the better-documented periods are often complicated or "murky", according to Dhanens. There is almost no record from the early 16th century through 1851, and the theft in 1877 leaves doubt for some as to what exactly was returned. Historian Léon de Laborde documented an altarpiece in a village near Nantes in 1851 – a Madonna in a church nave holding the Christ Child in her right arm – which he described as "painted on wood, very well preserved, still in its original frame". The description contains a detailing of the frame's inscription. A document from 1855 records a Virgin in the Church thought to be by Hubert and Jan van Eyck, which may be the same painting. It belonged to a Monsieur Nau, who had bought it for 50 francs from the housekeeper of Francois Cacault, a French diplomat who had acquired a number of paintings from Italy.

A panel very similar in description was purchased by the Aachen art collector Barthold Suermondt sometime during the 1860s and catalogued in 1869 with a detailing of the frame's inscription. This work was thought to have come from Nantes, suggesting it was the same as the panel mentioned in 1851. The Suermondt collection was acquired by the Berlin museum in May 1874, as part of an acquisition of 219 paintings. The painting was stolen in March 1877, generating worldwide news coverage; it was recovered ten days later, but without the original frame. The 1875 Berlin museum catalogue attributes a van Eyck imitator; the 1883 catalogue describes the original as lost and the Berlin painting a copy. Soon after, however, its authenticity was verified, and the 1904 Berlin catalogue attributed Jan.

Philip the Good may have been the original patron, given that a painting matching its description was recorded in a 1567 inventory of his great-granddaughter Margaret of Austria, who inherited the majority of Philip's collection. The description in her record reads, "Un autre tableau de Nostre-Dame, du duc Philippe, qui est venu de Maillardet, couvert de satin brouché gris, et ayant fermaulx d'argent doré et bordé de velours vert. Fait de la main Johannes." From the naming conventions known from the collection's inventory, "Johannes" probably refers to van Eyck, "duc Philippe" to Philip.

== See also ==
- List of works by Jan van Eyck
