= Madonna at the Fountain =

Painting by Jan van Eyck

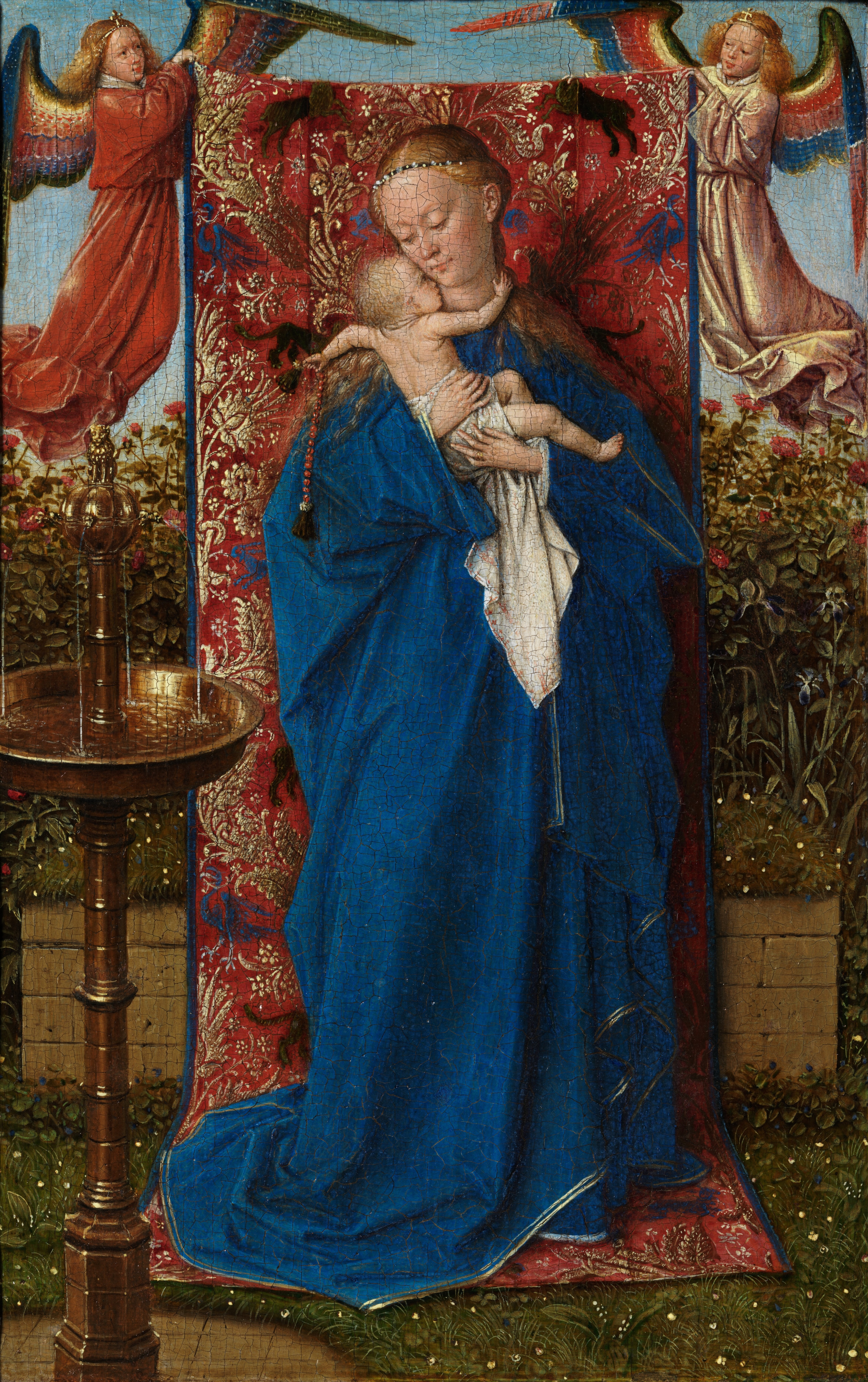
- Artist: Jan van Eyck
- Year: 1439
- Medium: Oil on panel
- Dimensions: 19 cm × 12 cm (7.5 in × 4.7 in)
- Location: Royal Museum of Fine Arts Antwerp, Antwerp

The Madonna at the Fountain is a 1439 oil on panel painting by the early Netherlandish artist Jan van Eyck. It belongs to van Eyck's late work, and is his last signed and dated painting. It retains its original frame, which bears the inscription: "ALS IXH CAN", "JOHES DE EYCK ME FECIT + [COM]PLEVIT ANNO 1439

At 19 x 12 cm. the painting is only a little larger than a postcard. It is set in a hortus conclusus, with the fountain representing the fountain of life. The Madonna is depicted dressed in blue, her figure framed by a richly embroidered cloth of honor supported by two angels. The Christ Child holds prayer beads in his left hand, suggesting, along with the rose bush behind the figures, the rosary. In the mid to late 15th century the rosary was becoming increasingly popular in northern Europe.

This depiction is unusual in that the Madonna wears a blue robe; in the Dresden Triptych, Lucca Madonna, and the Madonna of Chancellor Rolin, van Eyck had depicted her dressed in red. The use of red for the clothes of sacred figures was characteristic of 15th century Netherlandish painting, as cochineal was among the most expensive pigments available for dying textiles. In contrast to this, Italian painters used ultramarine for the robes of Madonnas. Thus van Eyck's choice of blue can be seen as evidence of Italian influence.

== Byzantine influence ==
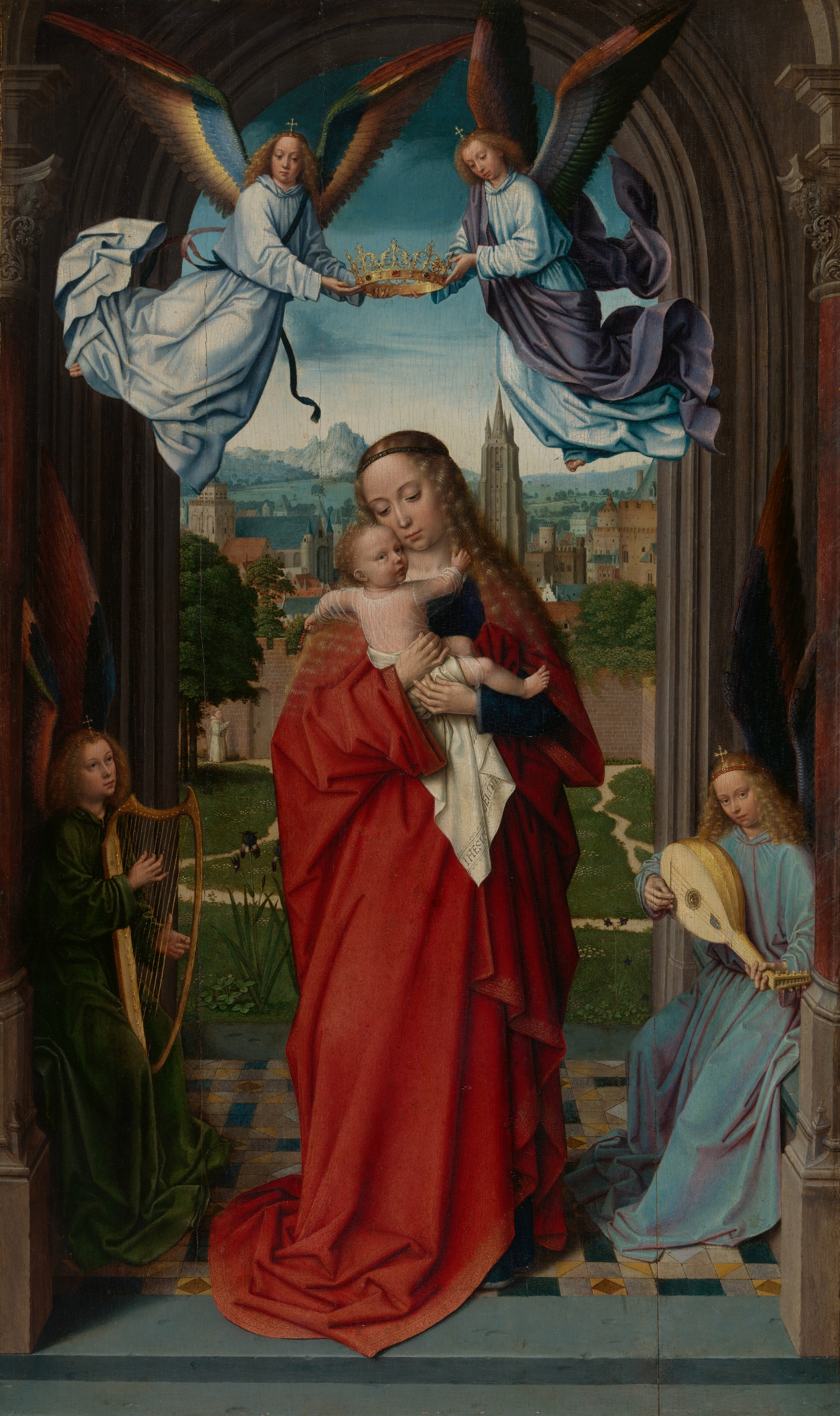
Gerard David, Virgin and Child with Four Angels, c. 1510–1515. 63.2 cm × 39.1 cm, Metropolitan Museum of Art.

With the Madonna in the Church in Berlin, this is generally thought to have been one of van Eyck's two paintings of the Madonna and Child from the final years before his death in about 1441. Both show a standing Virgin, in contrast to his earlier treatments of the subject, and the great majority of other painted Virgins. Models for standing Virgins existed in the icons of Byzantine art, and both paintings also represent modified version of the eleusa type, sometimes called the Virgin of Tenderness in English, where the Virgin and Child touch cheeks, and he reaches out a hand. The Madonna in the Church wears a blue cloak over a red dress.

During the early 14th and 15th century a large number of these works were imported into the North, and were widely copied by the first generation of Netherlandish artists, among others. The iconography of both the late Byzantine, typified by the unknown artist responsible for the Cambrai Madonna, and 14th century successors such as Giotto favoured showing the Madonna in a monumental scale, and it is accepted by art historians that van Eyck absorbed these influences, though when and through which works is disputed. It is believed that he had direct exposure to them during his visit to Italy, which occurred either in 1426 or 1428. Van Eyck's two panels carried forward the habit of reproduction and were themselves frequently copied by commercial workshops throughout the 15th century.

It is possible that the Byzantine flavour to these images was also connected with contemporary attempts through diplomacy to achieve reconciliation with the Greek Orthodox Church, in which van Eyck's patron Philip the Good took a keen interest. Van Eyck's Portrait of Cardinal Niccolò Albergati (c. 1431) had depicted one of the diplomats most involved with these efforts, acting for the Papacy.

== Copies ==
The image was much copied, with a very high-quality copy assigned to van Eyck's workshop just after the original (Private collection, Maastricht). There is a workshop drawing of the central figures by Gerard David of about 1500–1510 in the Kupferstichkabinett Berlin, presumably used for his version of the figures, now with four angels and a panoramic landscape background of Bruges, now in the Metropolitan Museum of Art, New York. This was planned as a precise copy, but the new elements were added while the work was in progress, as modern scientific analysis of the underdrawing shows.

== See also ==
- List of works by Jan van Eyck
