= Crucifixion (van Eyck) =

Drawing attributed to Jan van Eyck or his workshop

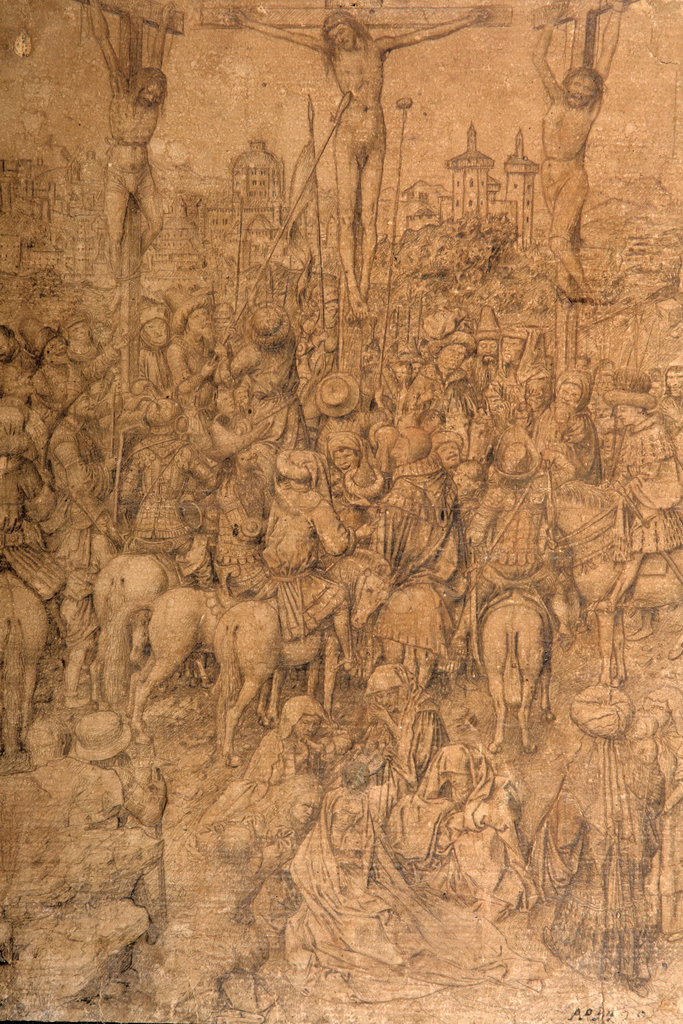
Crucifixion, c. 1440. Gold and silver stylus, pen and brush and lead slate pencil, Museum Boijmans van Beuningen, 25.4 cm x 18.7 cm

Crucifixion is an early-15th-century drawing of the death of Jesus attributed to Jan van Eyck or his workshop, now in the collection of the Museum Boijmans van Beuningen. It is variously dated to the early 1430s, implying an original van Eyck likely created as a predatory drawing for his Crucifixion and Last Judgement diptych, or c. 1440, making it a pastiche by a workshop member completed after Jan's death.

The only other known van Eyck drawing is the 1437 Study for Cardinal Niccolò Albergati, if Saint Barbara is considered as an unfinished painting, although there are similarities between the two; especially in its perspective, angle of the observer's point of view, and the shadings of the rock formations. The quality of draftsmanship is of the first rate, and it is perhaps the most elaborate and complex surviving drawing from the 16th century.

== Description ==
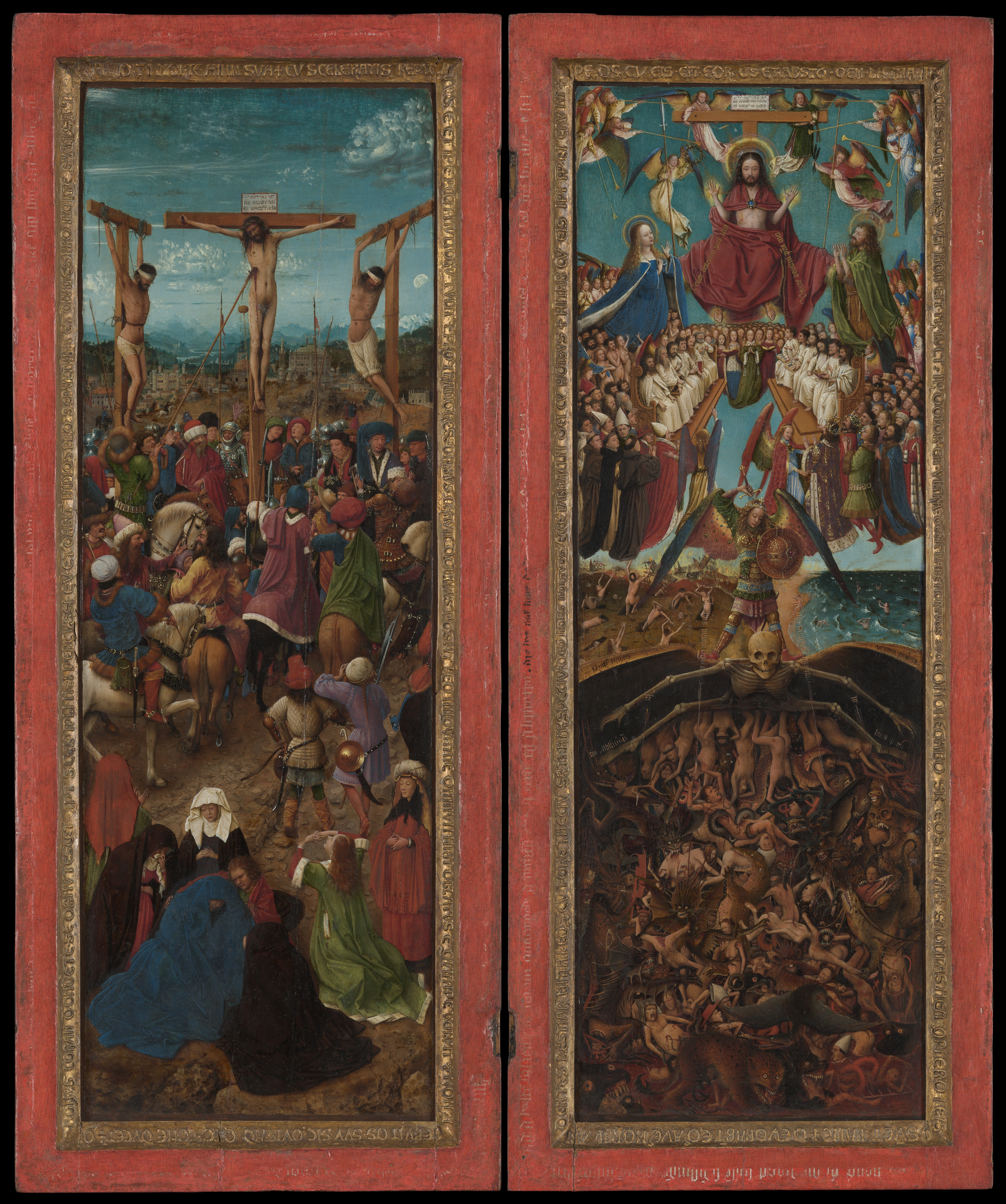
Jan van Eyck, Crucifixion and Last Judgement diptych, c. 1430–1440. Metropolitan Museum of Art, New York

The drawing is executed in gold and silver stylus, pen, brush and lead slate pencil. It is in poor condition, being covered in yellowish varnish which has damaged both the paper and drawing. The drawing is linked to the left-hand panel of the New York Crucifixion and Last Judgement diptych, which is generally, but not always, attributed to Jan; likely workshop members completed many passages on the right-hand frame. As such, the drawing is either an original preparatory study or a workshop pastiche by an associate for commercial sale.

It shows a mass of people gathering around a crucifixion scene, with Christ's followers grieving in the foreground (though they are thinly described compared to the other figures), soldiers and spectators hanging around in the mid-ground and a portrayal of three crucified bodies in the upper-ground. Both works contain a number of similarly depicted and positioned figures, share the same steep perspective, with the city of Jerusalem can be seen in the distance, though at a much lower angle here than in the finished diptych.
