= Study for Cardinal Niccolò Albergati =

Painting by Jan van Eyck

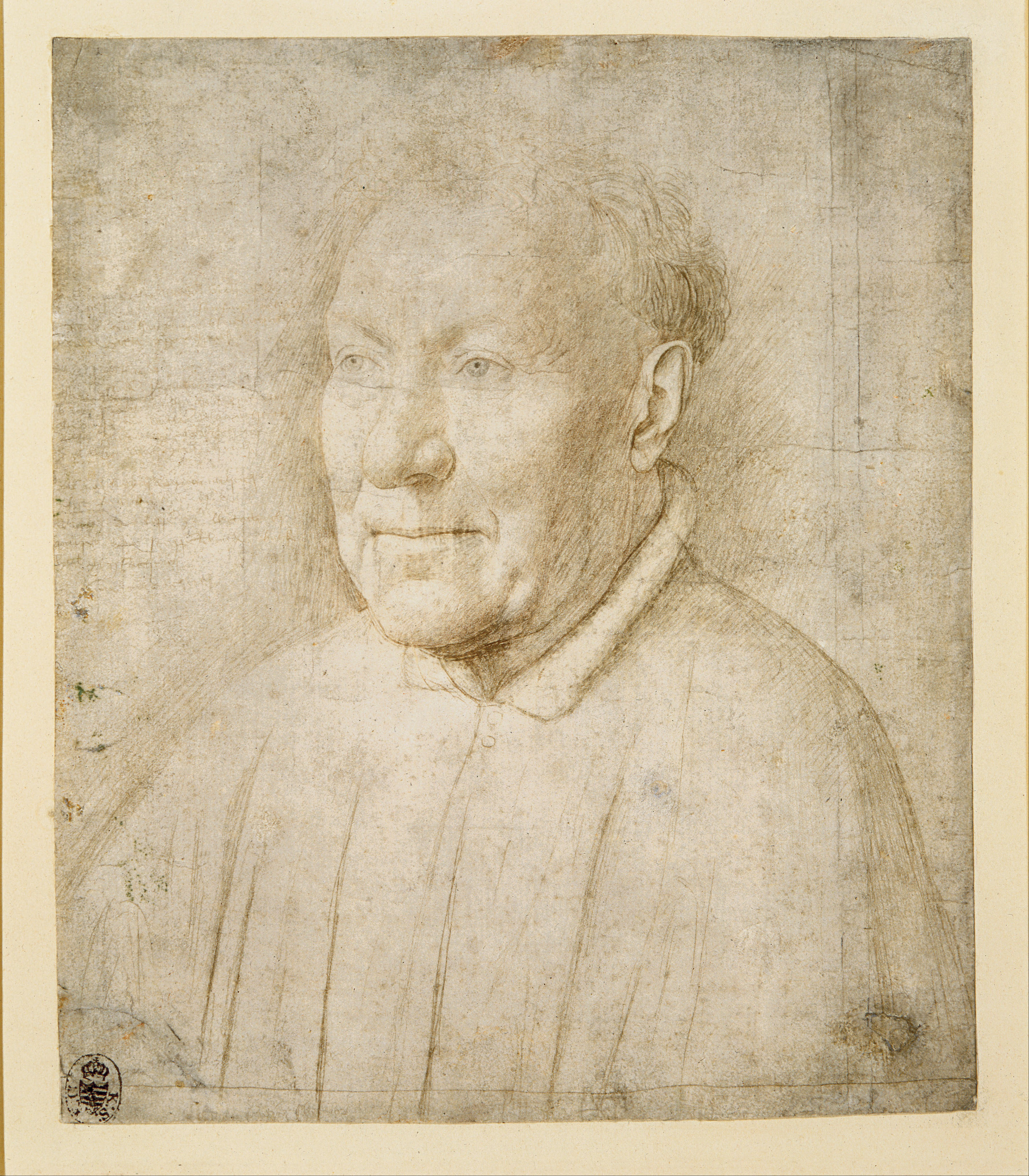
c 1431, Jan van Eyck

Study for Cardinal Niccolò Albergati is a silverpoint drawing attributed to the Early Netherlandish painter Jan van Eyck, made in preparation for his Portrait of Cardinal Niccolò Albergati of 1431.

The preparatory study shows an elderly cleric who is visibly ageing and imprinted with deep lines below his eyes. He is shown in near full frontal profile, dressed in the red robe of a cardinal, with a gown lined with luxurious fur.

The drawing, along with the Saint Barbara in the Royal Museum of Fine Arts Antwerp and Crucifixion in the Museum Boijmans van Beuningen are the only surviving drawings by van Eyck. The work is especially valuable to art historians as it includes notes made to indicate the colours intended for the final oil portrait.

While Niccolò Albergati was traditionally identified as the subject of the drawing and portrait, some modern scholarship suggests that Henry Beaufort is more likely the subject.

== See also ==
List of works by Jan van Eyck

== Sources ==
- Ainsworth, Maryan Wynn. From Van Eyck to Bruegel: Early Netherlandish Paintings in the Metropolitan Museum of Art. NY: Metropolitan Museum of Art, 2009. ISBN 0-8709-9870-6
- Borchert, Till-Holger. Van Eyck. London: Taschen, 2008. ISBN 3-8228-5687-8
- Conway, Martin. "A Head of Christ by John van Eyck". The Burlington Magazine for Connoisseurs, Volume 39, No. 225, December 1921
- Harbison, Craig. Jan van Eyck, The Play of Realism. London: Reaktion Books, 1991. ISBN 0-948462-18-3
- Vale, Malcolm. "Cardinal Henry Beaufort and the 'Albergati' Portrait". The English Historical Review, volume 105, number 415, April 1990. JSTOR 570845
