= Niccolò Albergati =

Italian Roman Catholic prelate

Blessed Niccolò Albergati OCart
- Bishop of Bologna
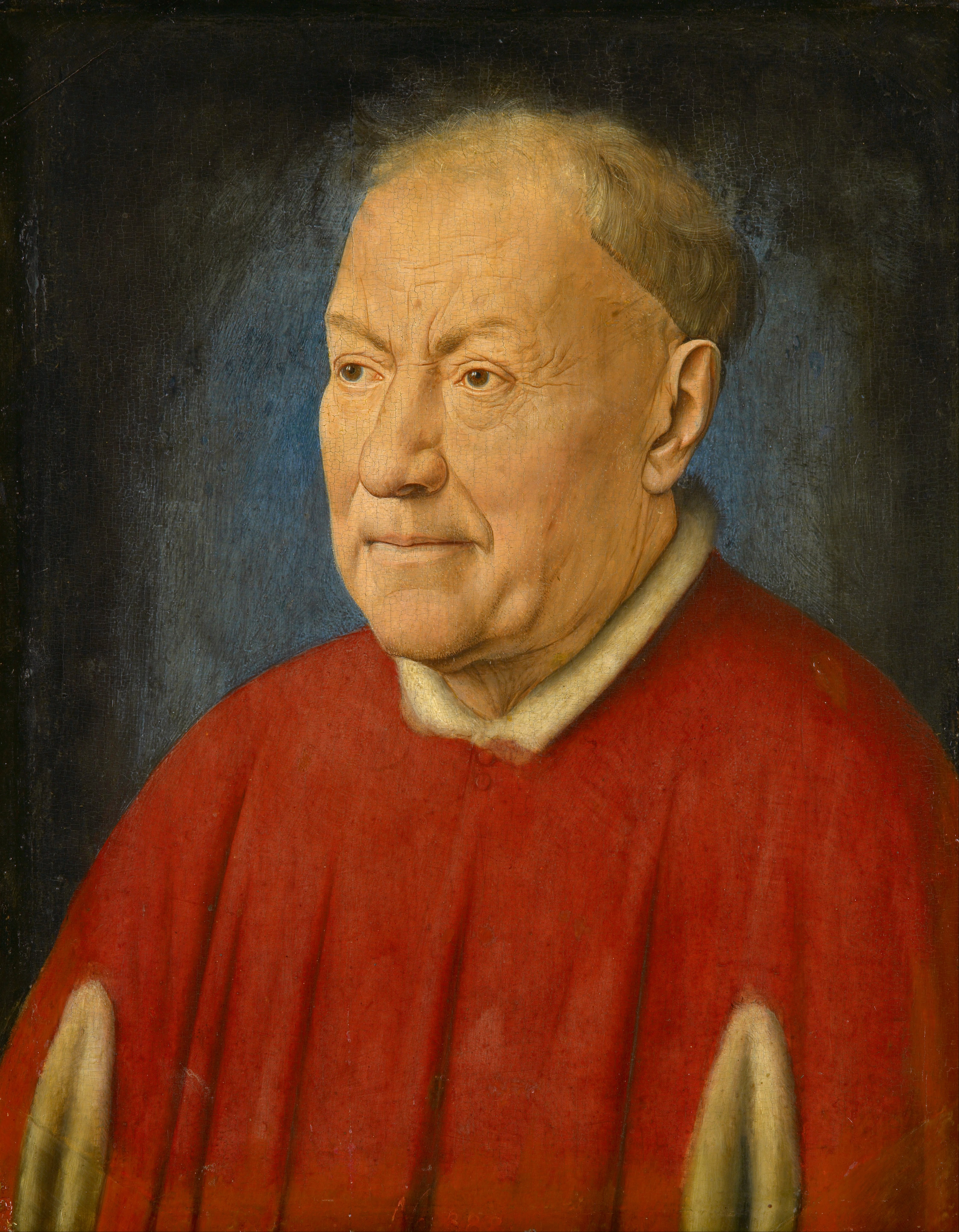
- Portrait by Jan van Eyck, c. 1431–1435
- Church: Roman Catholic Church
- Diocese: Bologna
- See: Bologna
- Appointed: 5 January 1417
- Installed: 4 July 1417
- Term ended: 9 May 1443
- Predecessor: Giovanni Di Michele
- Successor: Tommaso Parentucelli
- Other posts: Apostolic Administrator of Bologna (1426–43); Cardinal-Priest of Santa Croce in Gerusalemme (1426–43); Archpriest of the Basilica di Santa Maria Maggiore (1440–43); Major Penitentiary of the Apostolic Penitentiary (1438–43)
- Previous posts: Apostolic Nuncio to France (1422–23); Apostolic Nuncio to England (1422–23); Camerlengo of the Sacred College of Cardinals (1431–32)

Orders
- Ordination: June 1404 by Bartolomeo Raimondi
- Consecration: 4 July 1417 by Tommaso Perenduli
- Created cardinal: 27 May 1426 by Pope Martin V
- Rank: Cardinal-Priest

Personal details
- Born: 1373 Bologna, Papal States
- Died: 9 May 1443 (aged 69–70) Siena, Republic of Siena
- Education: University of Bologna

Sainthood
- Feast day: 9 May
- Venerated in: Roman Catholic Church
- Beatified: 25 September 1744; Rome by Pope Benedict XIV

Ordination history of Niccolò Albergati
History
Priestly ordination
- Ordained by: Bartolomeo Raimondi
Episcopal consecration
- Principal consecrator: Tommaso Perenduli
- Co-consecrators: Pietro Ondedi; Pietro Bolardi
Cardinalate
- Elevated by: Pope Martin V
Episcopal succession
Bishops consecrated by Niccolò Albergati as principal consecrator
- Hélie de Bourdeilles, OFM: 13 April 1438

Niccolò Albergati (1373 – 9 May 1443) was an Italian Carthusian and a prelate of the Roman Catholic Church. He was appointed cardinal and served as a papal diplomat to France and England (1422–23) in addition to serving as the bishop of Bologna from 1417 until his death.

He accepted the position as bishop in obedience despite his extreme reluctance to accept the position but carried out his duties with care and attention to educational concerns. But two conflicts in his see caused him to depart and later return and he became known for being close to Pope Martin V and his successor Pope Eugene IV. Both men held Albergati in high esteem and nominated him to crucial positions within the Roman Curia and the diplomatic service to oversee important missions. He had prominent roles in the Council of Basel-Ferrara-Florence and also attended the Council of Florence.

His student Tommaso Parentucelli later became pontiff and assumed the papal name "Nicholas" in honor of his mentor and patron. His other noted student Enea Silvio Bartolomeo Piccolomini also became pope sometime after Parentucelli.

His beatification received confirmation from Pope Benedict XIV on 25 September 1744.

== Life ==
=== Education and priesthood ===
Niccolò Albergati was born in 1373, in Bologna to Pier Nicola Albergati, who had a notable role in Bolognese communal life.

He first studied law at the college in Bologna from 1386, before he commenced his ecclesial studies. He entered the Carthusians in 1394 and was later professed in the San Girolamo di Casara convent near Florence on 25 September 1396. He received the minor orders on 9 June 1403 and was made a subdeacon on 22 September 1403, prior to being made a deacon in 1404. Albergati received his ordination to the priesthood in June 1404. The order's General Chapter in 1407 saw him named as the prior for the San Girolamo di Casara house and in 1412 was made to supervise all Italian houses of the order.

=== Episcopate ===
The Consiglio dei Seicento made the unanimous decision to make him the next bishop of Bologna on 4 January 1417. The cathedral chapter confirmed this on 5 January with the canon (and president of the chapter) Pietro da Saliceto announcing the decision to him on 8 January. He did not wish to become a bishop but had accepted in obedience to his superiors and to the pope. On 24 February he accepted the nomination in obedience and on 8 March the cathedral chapter asked the metropolitan of Ravenna to confirm the appointment which that official ratified on 15 March 1417. The archbishop of Ravenna, Tommaso Perenduli, conferred episcopal consecration upon him on 4 July with the bishop of Imola, Pietro Ondedi, and the bishop of Ferrara, Pietro Bolardi, acting as the co-consecrators. He was enthroned in his see right after the consecration. He set about at once making his hometown and his episcopal see a center of learning and humanism. Pope Martin V confirmed his appointment to the see on 13 April 1418 in a papal bull.

The pope later dispensed Albergati on 27 July 1418 from travelling to Rome to make the ritual oath of obedience to the pope which allowed for Albergati to instead make it before the bishops of Modena and Imola. That 20 December - upon the pope's invitation - he went to Mantua to discuss the political position of Bologna concerning the Papal States and left Mantua on 18 January 1419 for Rome and back to Bologna on 27 January due to his father's death. On 6 February he departed for Ferrara to meet the pope in order to validate the concordat that was stipulated in Mantua which then allowed for him to return on 17 February 1419 to Bologna. But Antongaleazzo Bentivoglio's rebellion against the pope in his see forced him to flee on 26 March 1420; he returned on 24 July after the rebellion had been quelled.

On 8 February 1422, he was appointed as the nuncio to both England and France in order to secure the reconciliation between both kingdoms; he returned from France on 9 August 1423. But crisis struck once again when Bentivoglio fermented another revolt in August 1428. This forced Albergati to flee to Modena but returned to his see under assurances that he would not be harmed. But the pope had enough of the revolt and placed Bologna under an interdict which forced Albergati to leave for Imola. The indignant Consiglio dei Seicento decided to elect the abbot Bartolomeo Zambeccari as the new bishop for Bologna but soon recognized Albergati as the legitimate bishop after Zambeccari renounced his false position.

=== Cardinalate ===
His successes led to the pope naming him as a cardinal on 24 May 1426 as the Cardinal-Priest of Santa Croce in Gerusalemme; he received that title on 27 May. Albergati participated in the 1431 papal conclave that selected Pope Eugene IV. The new pope named him as a legate to Florence in 1431, in addition to the cities of Milan and Venice.

In his role as a diplomat, he helped to mediate between Sigismund and Pope Martin V and later repeated this in similar circumstances between King Charles VII and Pope Eugene IV. He represented Pope Eugene IV at the 1435 Congress of Arras with the aid of Cardinal Hugues de Lusignan. The congress failed to make peace between England and France but did effect a reconciliation between Philip the Good and the French crown of King Charles VII. He had a role in the Council of Basel-Ferrara-Florence and opened the Council of Florence which brought about a short-lived union of the Latin and Greek Churches. Eugene IV had sent him to preside over the Basel Council but the other cardinals refused to accept him. This prompted Albergati to go to Florence but later accompanied the pope to Ferrara to preside over the relocated council's first session on 8 January 1438. On 13 February 1439, he travelled to Florence to attend another session of the council but did not sign the document that would lead to Latin-Greek Church unification even though it was something he desired.

==== Mentorship ====
Under his tutelage were important figures such as Tommaso Parentucelli and Enea Silvio Bartolomeo Piccolomini who both became popes. Francesco Filelfo was another under his tutelage. He had ordained and consecrated Parentucelli and served as a great influence upon him to the point that Parentucelli chose the pontifical name "Nicholas" upon his ascension to the papal throne in honor of his mentor and patron. Albergati had also written several theological treatises and encouraged academics within his diocese.

=== Death ===
He died in Siena at an Augustinian convent on 9 May 1443 due to a severe case of kidney stones resulting in renal failure. He had been travelling with the pope and cardinalate to Rome from Florence but his failing health forced him to remain in Siena where he died after his condition worsened. Eugene IV presided over his funeral on 11 May and his remains were interred in the Monte Acuto convent of the Carthusians in Florence. His red galero was suspended from the ceiling of the Siena Cathedral and another suspended above his heart deposited in the Augustinian convent's chapel next to the main altar. Pope Urban VIII in 1633 permitted his exhumation where it was discovered his brain was found intact; his brain was sent to Bologna.

== Beatification ==
His beatification received official confirmation from Pope Benedict XIV on 25 September 1744 in the papal bull Singulare Divinae Providentiae upon the recognition of the late cardinal's popular and longstanding "cultus" - or enduring veneration on the part of the faithful.

== See also ==
- Portrait of Cardinal Niccolò Albergati
- Study for Cardinal Niccolò Albergati
