= Virgin and Child with Four Angels =

Painting by Gerard David

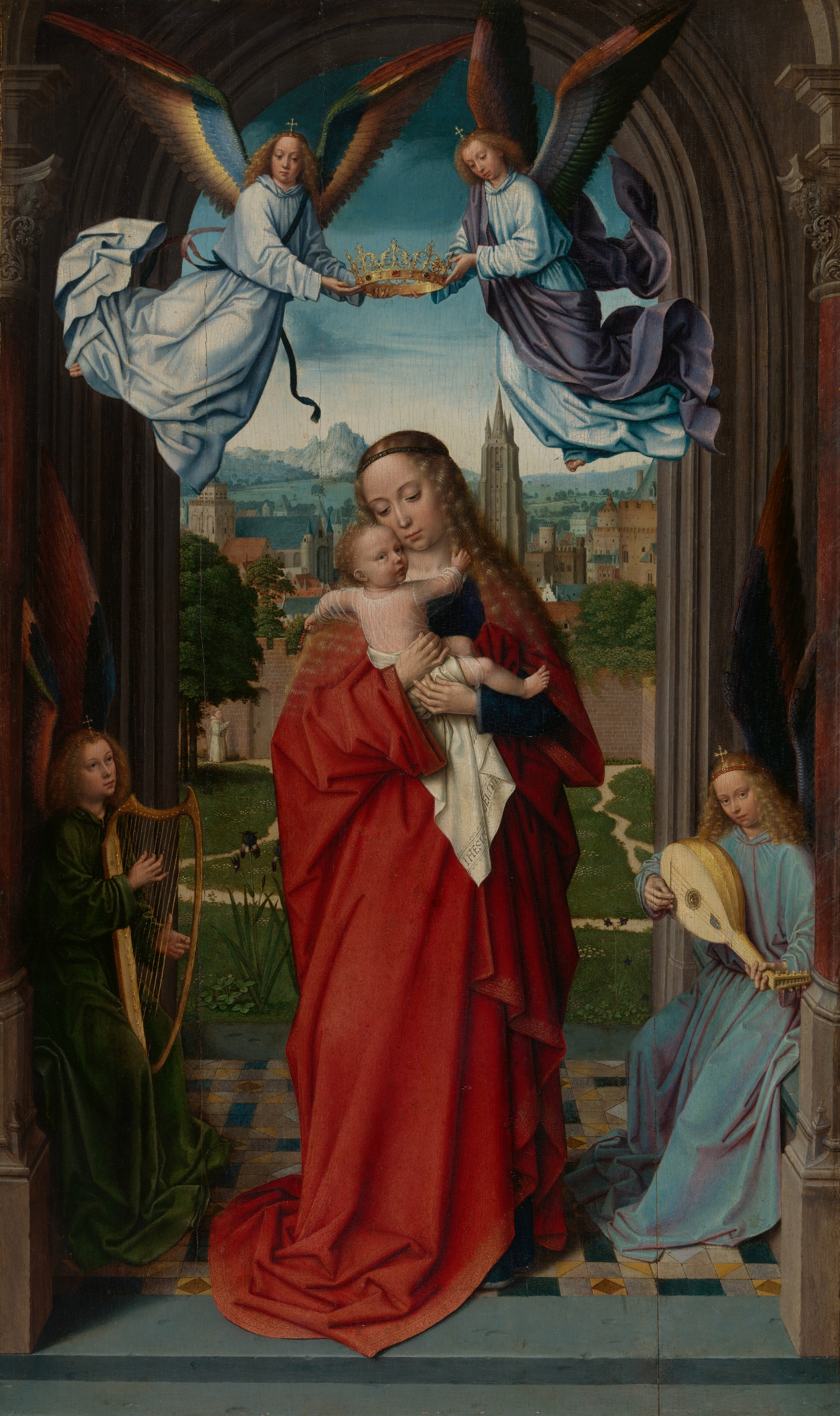
- Artist: Gerard David
- Year: c. 1510–1515
- Medium: Oil on panel
- Dimensions: 63.2 cm × 39.1 cm (24.9 in × 15.4 in)
- Location: Metropolitan Museum of Art, New York

Virgin and Child with Four Angels (or Virgin and Child with Angels) is a small oil-on-panel painting by the Early Netherlandish artist Gerard David. Likely completed between 1510 and 1515, it shows the Virgin Mary holding the child Jesus, while she is crowned Queen of Heaven by two angels above her, accompanied by music provided by another two angels placed at either side of her. In its fine detail and lush use of colour the work is typical of both David and late period Flemish art.

The painting is heavily influenced by Jan van Eyck's Virgin with Child at a Fountain, especially in the modeling of the Madonna and child. However, David has introduced many significant modifications with a view of Bruges in the distance. Van Eyck's panel was heavily influenced by the conventions of Byzantine art and was likely itself a blend of specific works. Yet the painting is mid-Renaissance in its humanisation of the Virgin and child; in earlier works, the mother and child figures were presented as distant, remote deities. In David's panel, they are entirely human and recognisable as an affectionate and bonded mother and son.

Virgin and Child with Four Angels has been housed in the Metropolitan Museum of Art, New York, since its donation from a private collection in 1977. David inscribed the painting with the words "IHESVS [RE]DEMPT[OR]" ("Jesus Redeemer") on the columns.

== Overview ==
Painted for private devotion, it shows a full-length Mary holding Jesus. Mother and son are surrounded by four angels; the two above Mary are adorned with large colourful wings and hold a golden crown, symbolising her role as Queen of Heaven while another two, each bearing large wings, sit on either side of her playing a harp and lute respectively. The scene takes place below a Gothic arch in a walled garden—intended to represent Mary's pureness and virginity—and before a view of contemporary Bruges.

Painted on wood with a narrow, fine brush, the work is unusually vivacious and detailed. Mary has long, curled blonde hair, the strands of which are finely detailed with extremely thin brush strokes. She wears a heavily folded red gown lined with minutely described gold stitches, which are so delicately woven into the trims of the dress that they are not usually visible in reproduction. Jesus is wrapped in a white swaddling blanket, some of which hangs below him in vertical folds, the lines of which are continued in the folds of Mary's dress. The angels to their right and left wear dark green and light blue robes respectively.

All the figures are highly idealised, typical of the art of the period; naturalism is abandoned in favour of elongated figures, who in this work are out of proportion to each other. Mary is far larger than the angels, which adds to her unnatural, ethereal, heavenly presence. The eyes of all the figures are averted from the viewer; only the child Jesus looks directly out of the canvas. The work is highly symmetrical; the two central figures are balanced by two pairs of angels arranged on either side; Jesus occupies the dead centre of the canvas; and the garden is balanced by the lines of the pathway seen on either side of Mary. The church in the distance to the right is balanced by the hill in the far left.

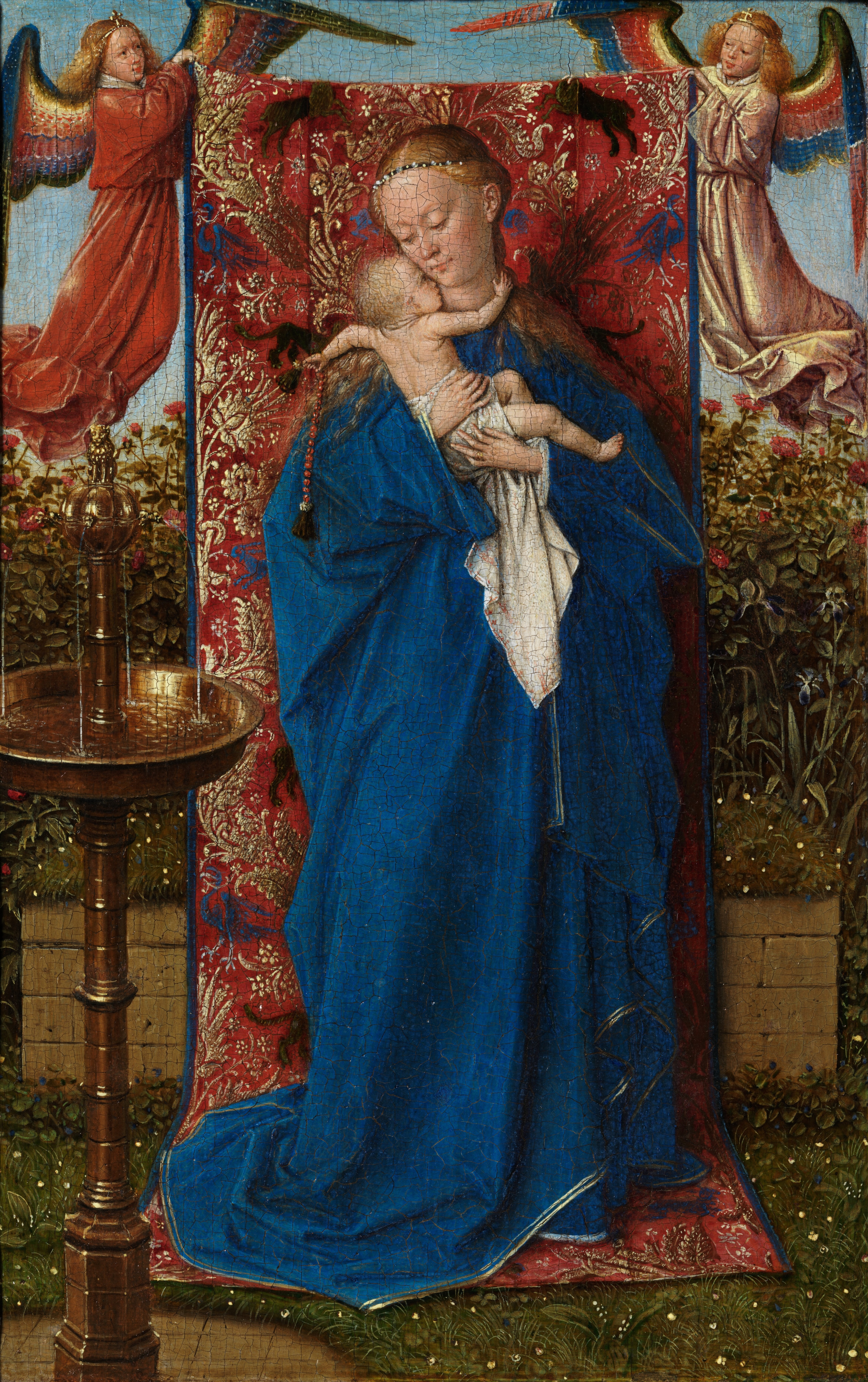
Madonna at the Fountain. Jan van Eyck, c. 1439. Royal Museum of Fine Arts, Antwerp. The cloth of honour held by the angels in the van Eyck is replaced by David with a golden crown.

The churches of Sint-Jakobs and Onze-Lieve-Vrouw can be identified in the cityscape beyond the garden. The placement of a Carthusian monk walking underneath a tree in the garden behind the main figures makes it likely that the work was commissioned by a member of their Genadedal monastery in Sint-Kruis outside Bruges. It is likely that the painting was the centre panel of a triptych or small winged altarpiece which was broken up at some unknown point. It has been speculated that the archway above Mary extended to two side panels in reference to the Trinity.

During the early 1500s Jan van Eyck's influence was at its height, and David heavily based his painting on van Eyck's late work Virgin and Child at a Fountain. Due to the popularity and demand for devotional pictures for use in private worship, the format of many biblical scenes or standard iconography became standardised, often copied from earlier painters, especially if the source picture itself was successful commercially—a panel painting of this type would have been commissioned at the highest end of the market. His Virgin and Child, also dated c. 1510–1515 and today part of a private collection in Belgium, is based on a painting by Adriaen Isenbrandt and is one of three near identical variants David painted of the scene in that format and pose.

David has added two more angels to van Eyck's scene, and sets the figures in a recognisable contemporary location. The figures of Mary and Jesus are nearly identical in both works, from the vertical folds of Mary's dress to the raised knee and arms of Jesus, with one arm reaching over his mother's shoulder while the other reaches for her neck. van Eyck's work was influenced by the Icons of Byzantine art, and this influence carries through to Gerard's piece.

Art historian Maryan Ainsworth describes the painting as a "devotional object for the veneration of an esteemed icon" and believes that the Byzantine influence "trickled down" from van Eyck. It is not known for certain, however, which specific icons may have formed the basis for Virgin with Child at a Fountain, though suggestions based on similarity of pose and form have been made, including frescos in Notre Dame des Grâce in Montreal and Santa Maria del Carmine, Naples. Gerard presents a very different representation of the Virgin than found in Byzantine representations. She is less a remote iconic deity and more recognisably human.

== Gallery ==
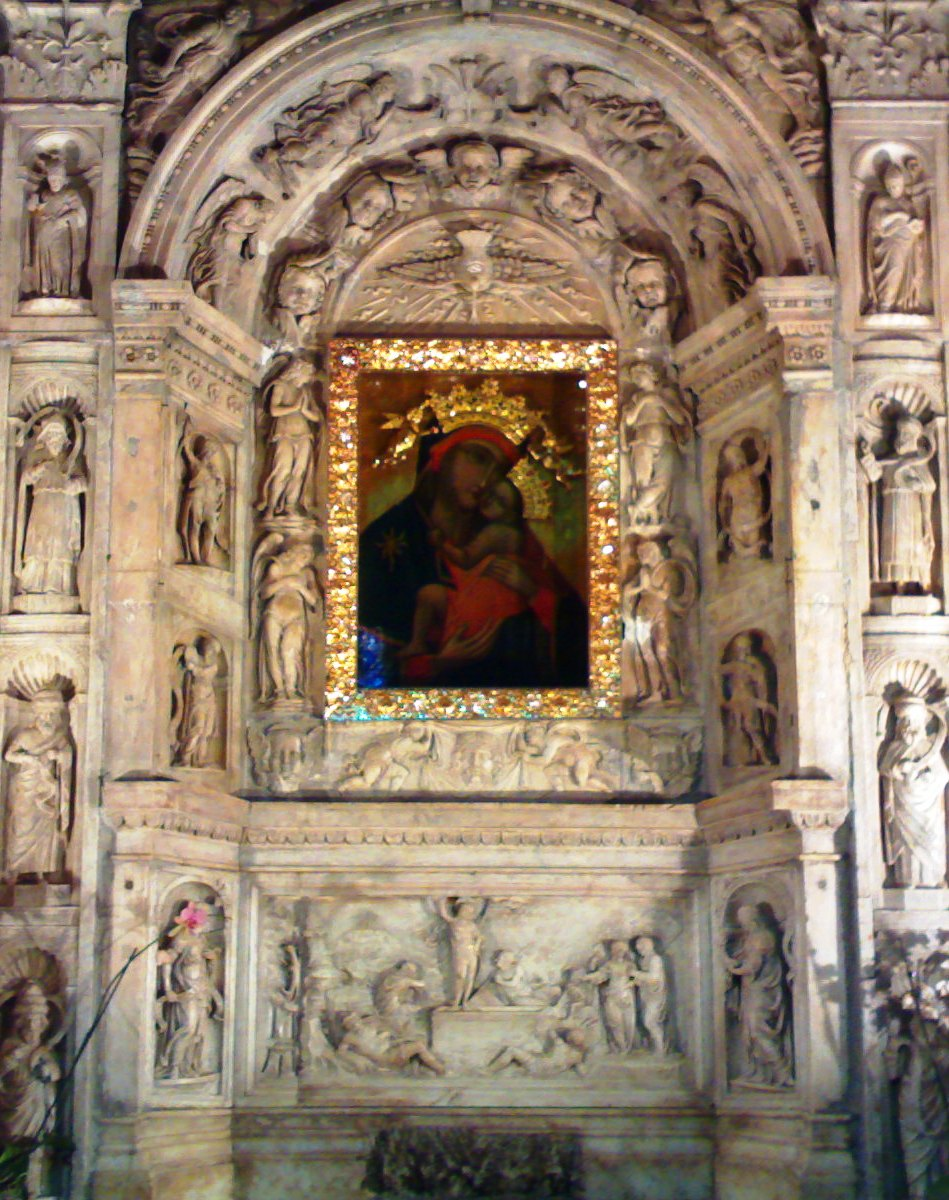
This work showing the Virgin and Child has been speculated as a possible source for van Eyck's Virgin with Child at a Fountain.

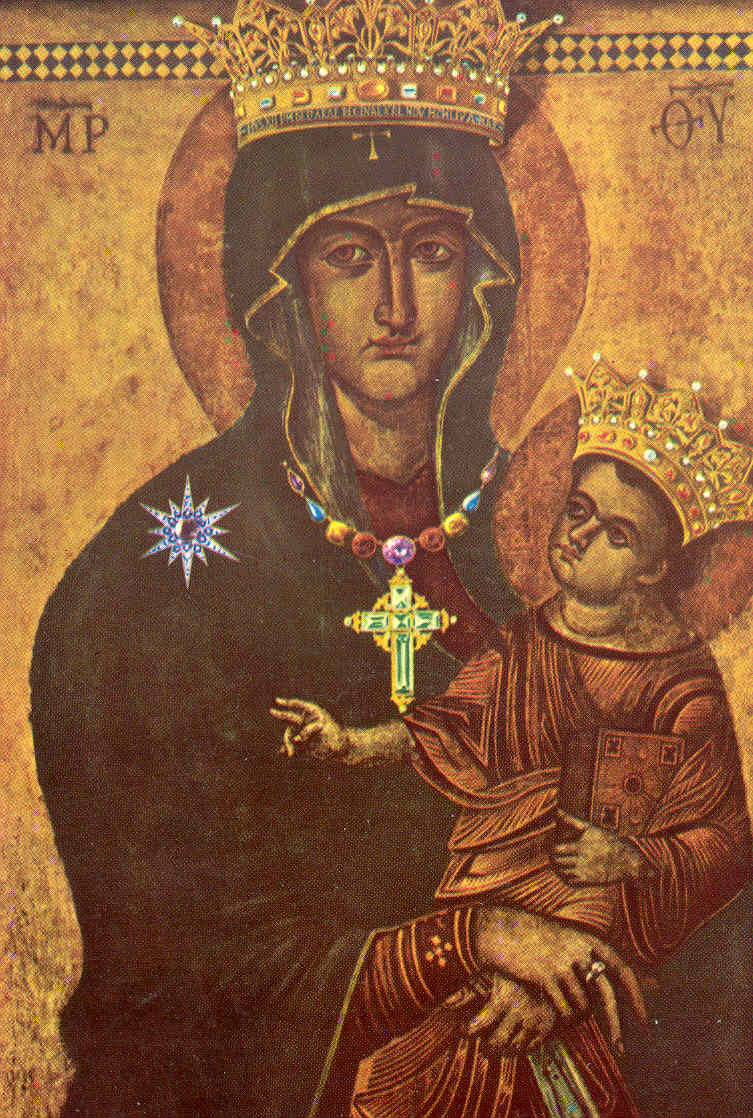
Salus Populi Romani, a Byzantine icon of the Madonna and Child. Before 1240.

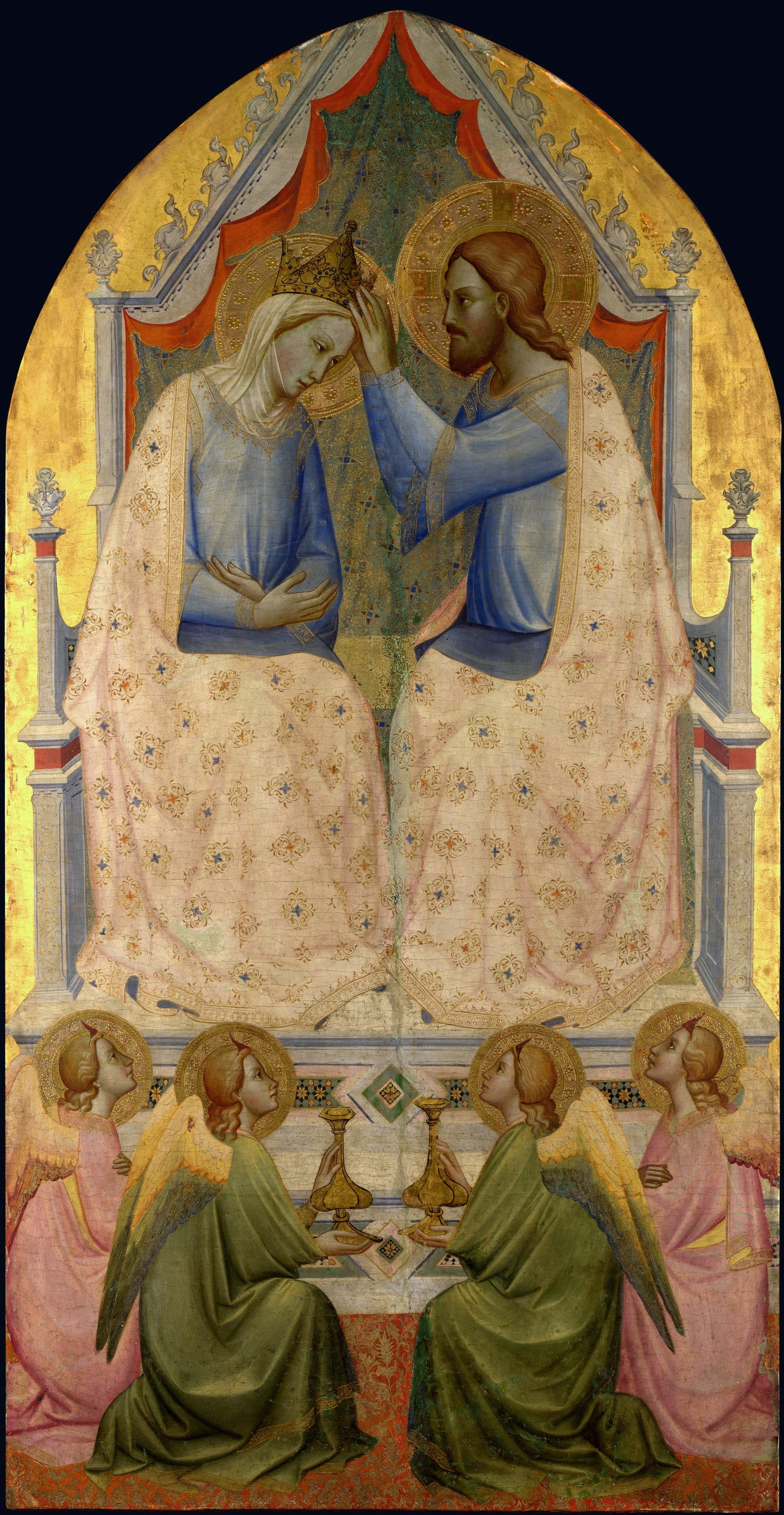
Coronation of the Virgin, Agnolo Gaddi, 14th century

== Sources ==
- Ainsworth, Maryan Wynn; Christiansen, Keith. From Van Eyck to Bruegel. New York: Metropolitan Museum of Art, 1998. ISBN 0-87099-870-6
- Baetjer, Katharine; Moffett, Charles; Walker, Dean; Christiansen, Keith; Sprinson, Mary. "Notable Acquisitions". Metropolitan Museum of Art, No. 1975/1979.
- Borchert, Till-Holger. Van Eyck to Dürer: The Influence of Early Netherlandish Painting on European Art, 1430–1530. London: Thames & Hudson, 2011. ISBN 0-500-23883-9
- Harbison, Craig. Jan van Eyck: the play of realism. Reaktion Books, 1995. ISBN 0-948462-79-5
- Salinger, Margaretta. "An Annunciation by Gerard David." Metropolitan Museum of Art Bulletin, volume 9, no. 9, May 1951.
- Smeyers, Maurits; Cardon, Bert; Smeyers, Katharina. Als Ich Can. Peeters, 2002. ISBN 90-429-1233-2
