= Master of 1499 =

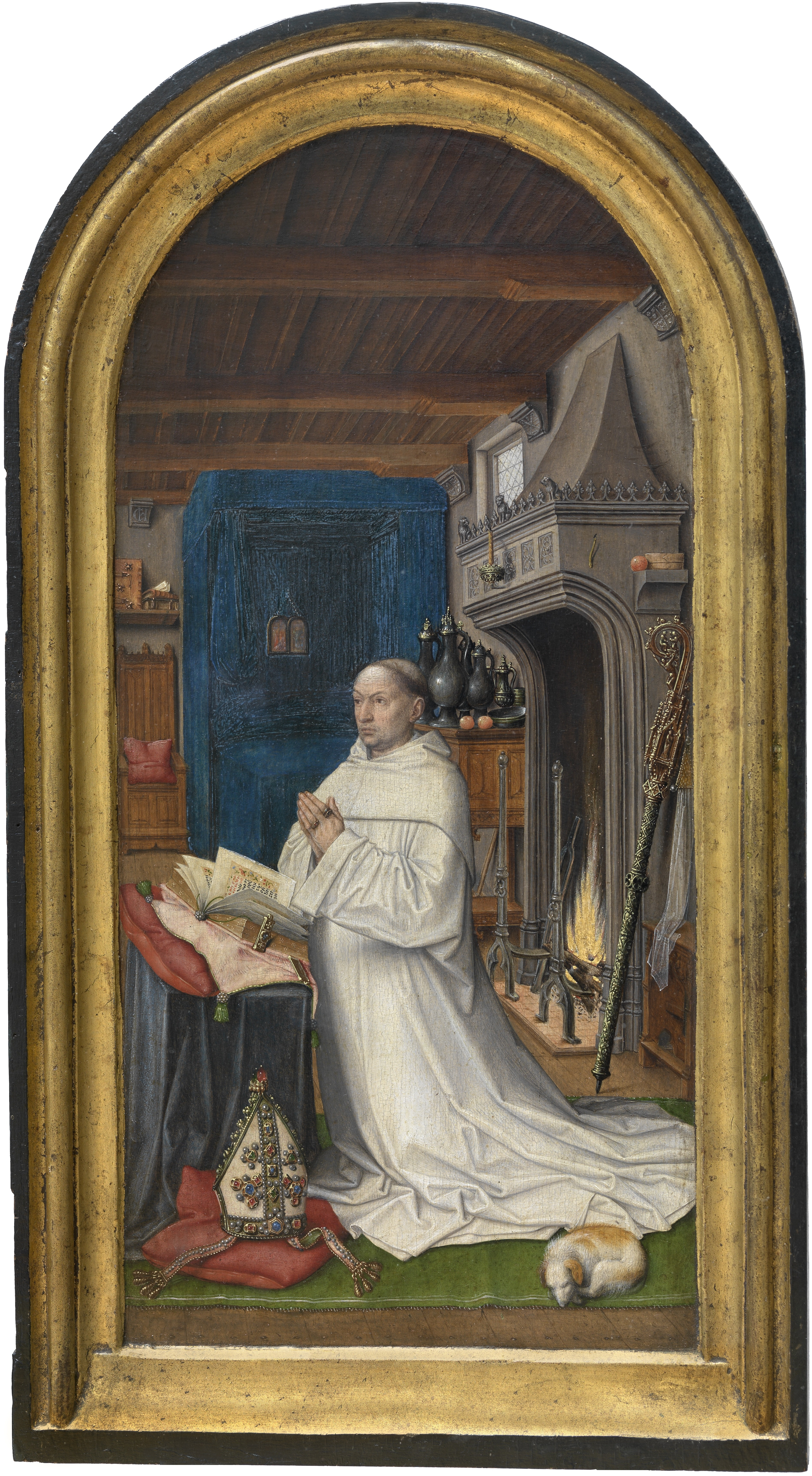
Portrait of Abbot Christiaan de Hondt, oil on panel, Koninklijk Museum voor Schone Kunsten, Antwerp. Right wing of a diptych; the left wing is a copy after Van Eyck's Madonna in the Church

The Master of 1499, sometimes called the Bruges Master of 1499, was a Flemish painter active at the end of the fifteenth century, known from four paintings, all closely related to earlier works by others, and one dated "1499".

It appears likely that he was from Ghent and not from Bruges, his name notwithstanding. He copied the style of Hugo van der Goes, and his name is derived from a diptych he painted for Christian de Hondt, dated to 1499 and preserved in Antwerp, in the Koninklijk Museum voor Schone Kunsten; in this painting he copies the work of Jan van Eyck. His output also includes a Madonna and Child with Four Saints, now in Richmond, Virginia; a Coronation of the Virgin in the Royal Collection; a diptych of the Annunciation in Berlin; and a Holy Family with Angels in Antwerp.
