= Portrait of Cardinal Niccolò Albergati =

Painting by Jan van Eyck

Portrait of Cardinal Niccolò Albergati.
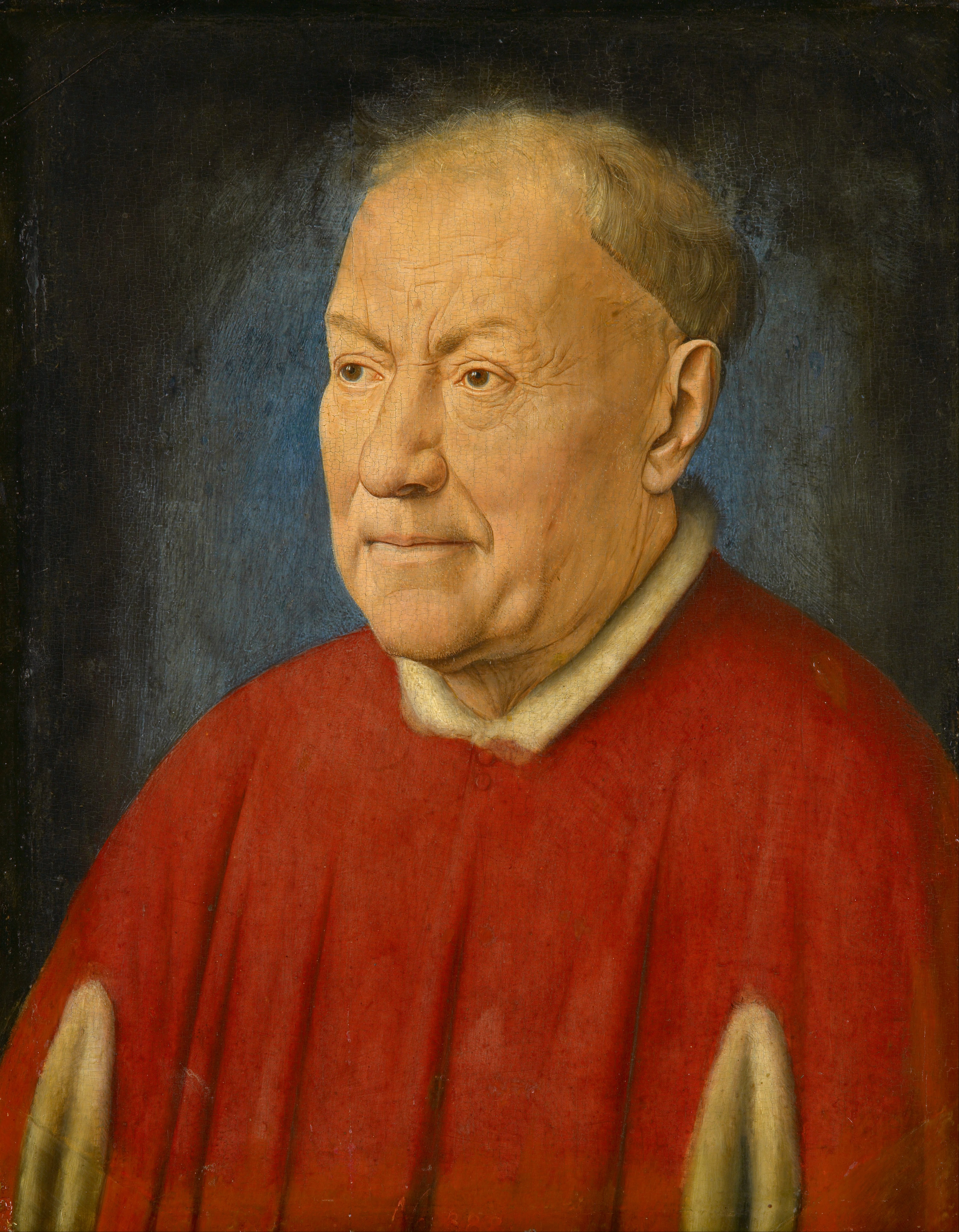
- Artist: Jan van Eyck
- Year: c. 1431
- Medium: Oil on canvas
- Subject: Possibly Niccolò Albergati or Henry Beaufort
- Dimensions: 34 cm × 27.5 cm (13 in × 10.8 in)
- Location: Kunsthistorisches Museum; Vienna

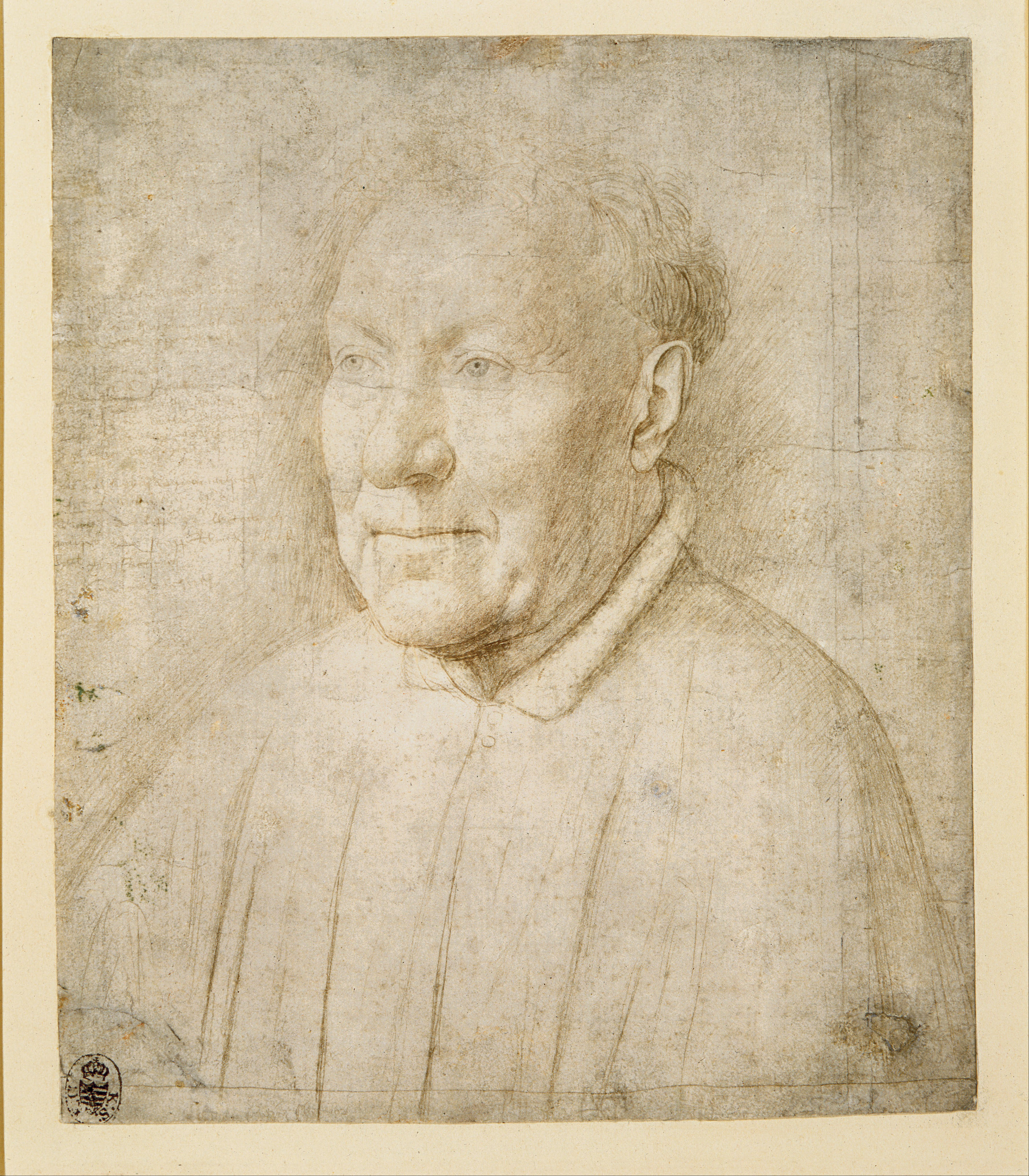
The preparatory drawing, Study for Cardinal Niccolò Albergati

The Portrait of Cardinal Niccolò Albergati is a painting by the early Netherlandish painter Jan van Eyck, dating to around 1431 and now in the Kunsthistorisches Museum of Vienna, Austria.

The work shows an elderly cleric who is visibly ageing with deep lines below his eyes. He is shown in near full-frontal profile, dressed in the red robe of a cardinal, lined with luxurious fur.

== Description ==
The cardinal is portrayed from three-quarters, as was usual in Flemish painting since as early as the 1430s. The dark background enhances the figure, who is lit by a bright light source. As is common in van Eyck's work, there is very close attention to detail, aided by his use of successive layers of colours diluted with oil, which allowed him to achieve deep effects of transparency and lucidity.

A preparatory drawing is now in the Staatliche Kunstsammlungen of Dresden, Germany. Comparison with the drawing shows that van Eyck changed several details, such as the depth of the shoulders, the lower curve of the nose, the depth of the mouth and mainly the size of the ear.

== Identity of the sitter ==
Niccolò Albergati was a diplomat working under Pope Martin V. He met van Eyck during a peace congress in Antwerp, who portrayed him in a drawing, which the artist added notes on the colors to execute a later painting portrait. The drawing is now in the Staatliche Kunstsammlungen of Dresden, Germany.

Although Albergati is traditionally identified as the sitter, some modern scholars suggest that Henry Beaufort is more likely to be its subject. If the portrait is of Henry Beaufort, it would be the earliest realistic portrait of an Englishman. Other scholars maintain it does not depict a cardinal at all.

== See also ==
- List of works by Jan van Eyck

== Sources ==
- Ainsworth, Maryan Wynn. From Van Eyck to Bruegel: Early Netherlandish Paintings in the Metropolitan Museum of Art. NY: Metropolitan Museum of Art, 2009. ISBN 0-8709-9870-6
- Borchert, Till-Holger. Van Eyck. London: Taschen, 2008. ISBN 3-8228-5687-8
- Conway, Martin. "A Head of Christ by John van Eyck". The Burlington Magazine for Connoisseurs, Volume 39, No. 225, December 1921
- Harbison, Craig. Jan van Eyck, The Play of Realism. London: Reaktion Books, 1991. ISBN 0-948462-18-3
- Otto Pächt. Van Eyck and the Founders of Early Netherlandish Painting. Harvey Miller, New York, 2000
- Schneider, Norbert. Jan van Eyck, the altar of Ghent: proposals for a reform of the church (in Spanish). 21st Century, 1997. ISBN 978-96823-2075-0
