= Aix Annunciation =

1443–1445 painting by Barthélemy d'Eyck

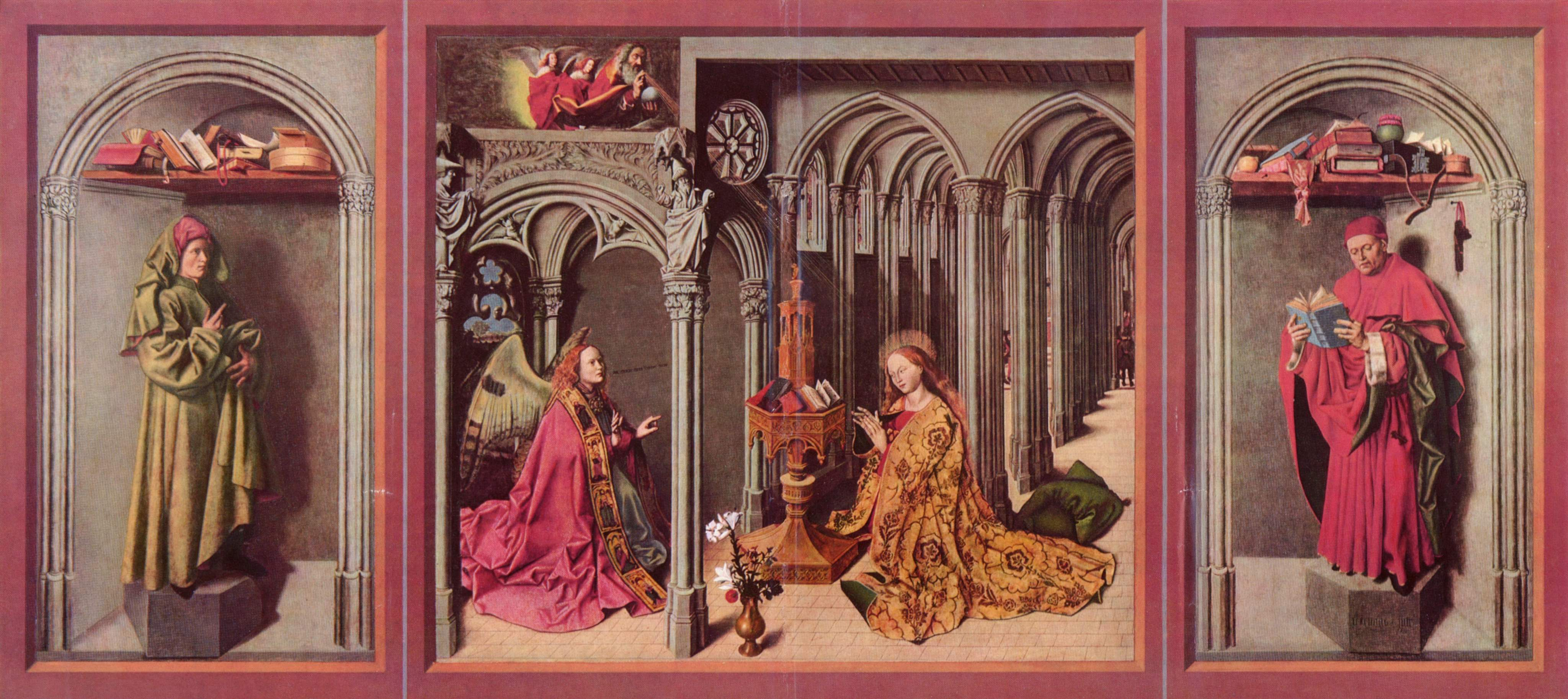
- Artist: Barthélemy d'Eyck
- Year: 1443–1445
- Type: Several techniques on panel
- Location: Various museums

The Aix Annunciation is a c. 1445 painting attributed to Barthélemy d'Eyck or the so-called Master of the Annunciation of Aix-en-Provence. It was commissioned for the Cathédrale Saint-Sauveur, Aix-en-Provence, southern France.

Now it is divided between the Église de la Madeleine in the same city (central panel with the Annunciation), the Museum Boijmans Van Beuningen (part of the left panel with the prophet Isaiah) at Rotterdam, the Rijksmuseum of Amsterdam (upper part of the left panel), while the right panel is in the Royal Museum of Fine Arts of Belgium in Brussels.

The side panels are painted on both sides and show Christ on the right and Mary Magdalene on the left (the upper part, on reverse of the Amsterdam panel, does not survive); together they used to form a Noli me tangere scene when the triptych was folded shut.

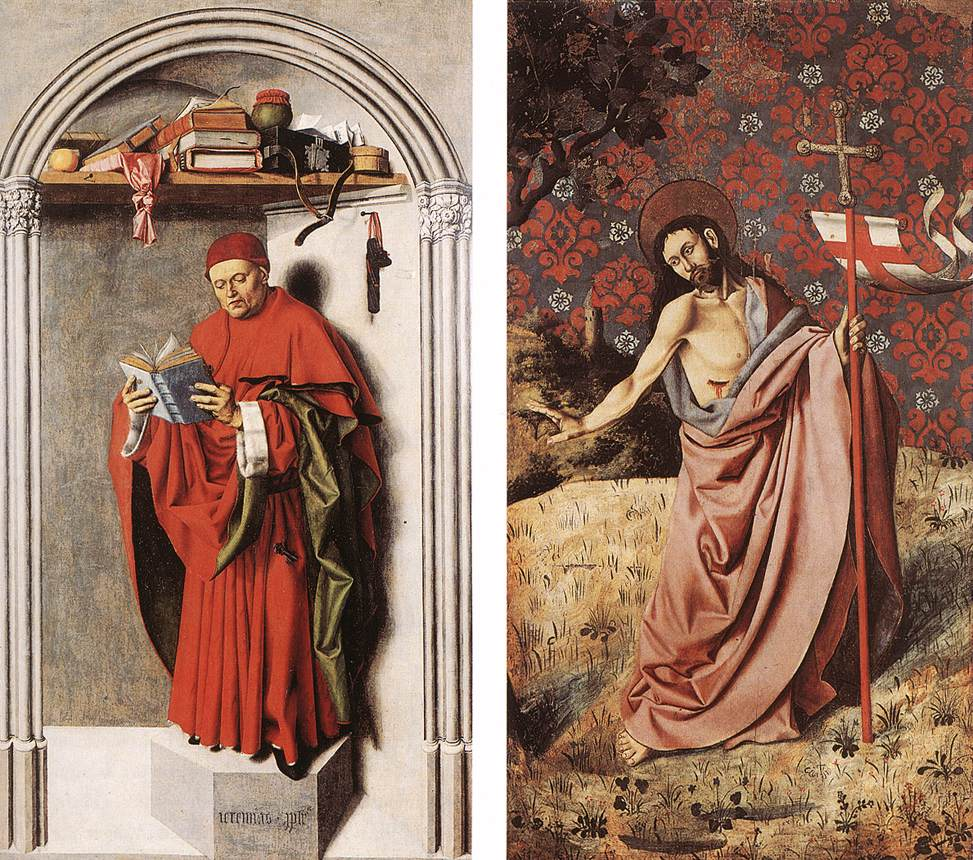
Jeremiah panel, and its reverse, showing Christ (now at Brussels).

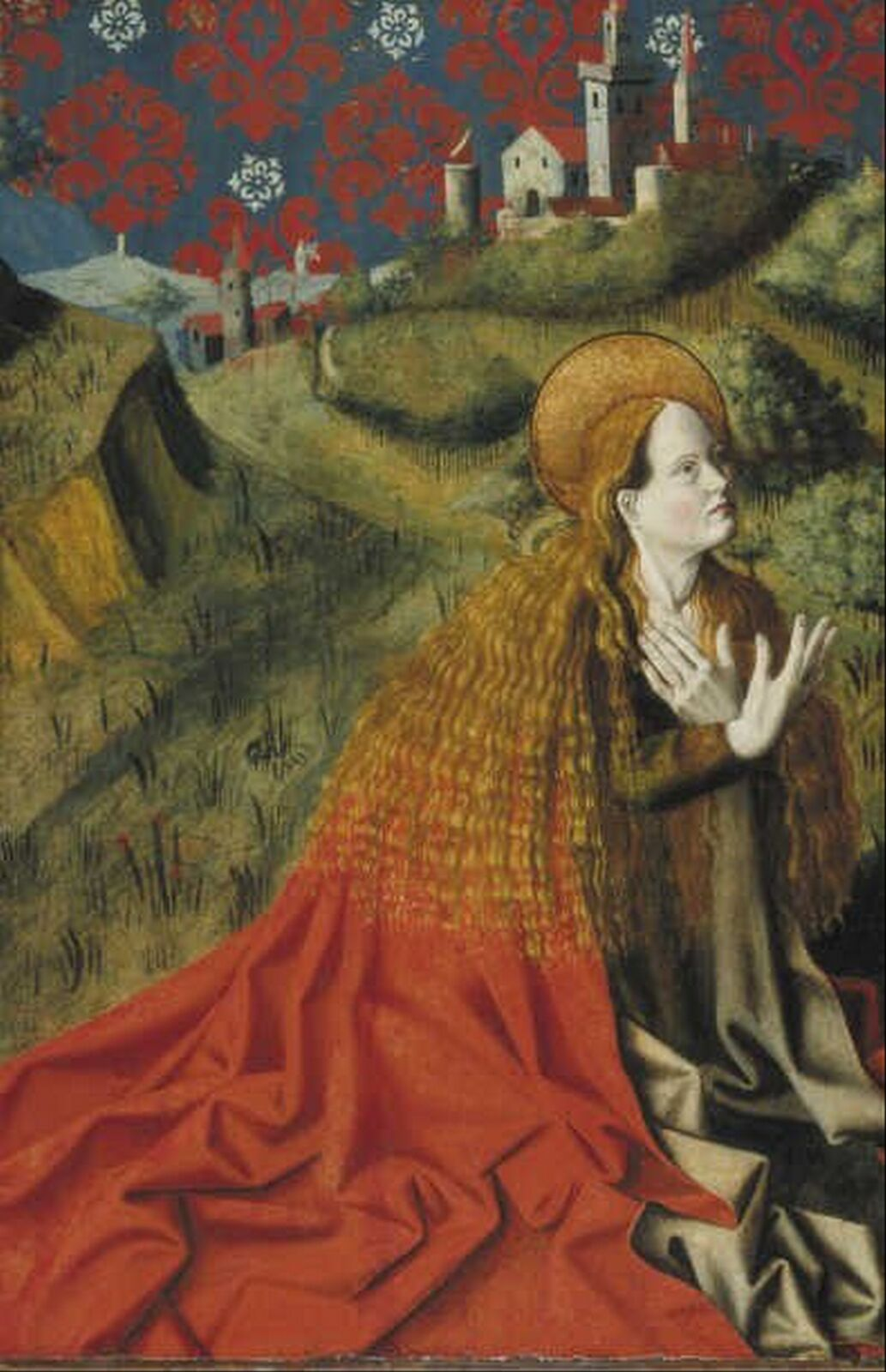
Mary Magdalene, on reverse of the lower part of the Isaiah panel (now at Rotterdam)

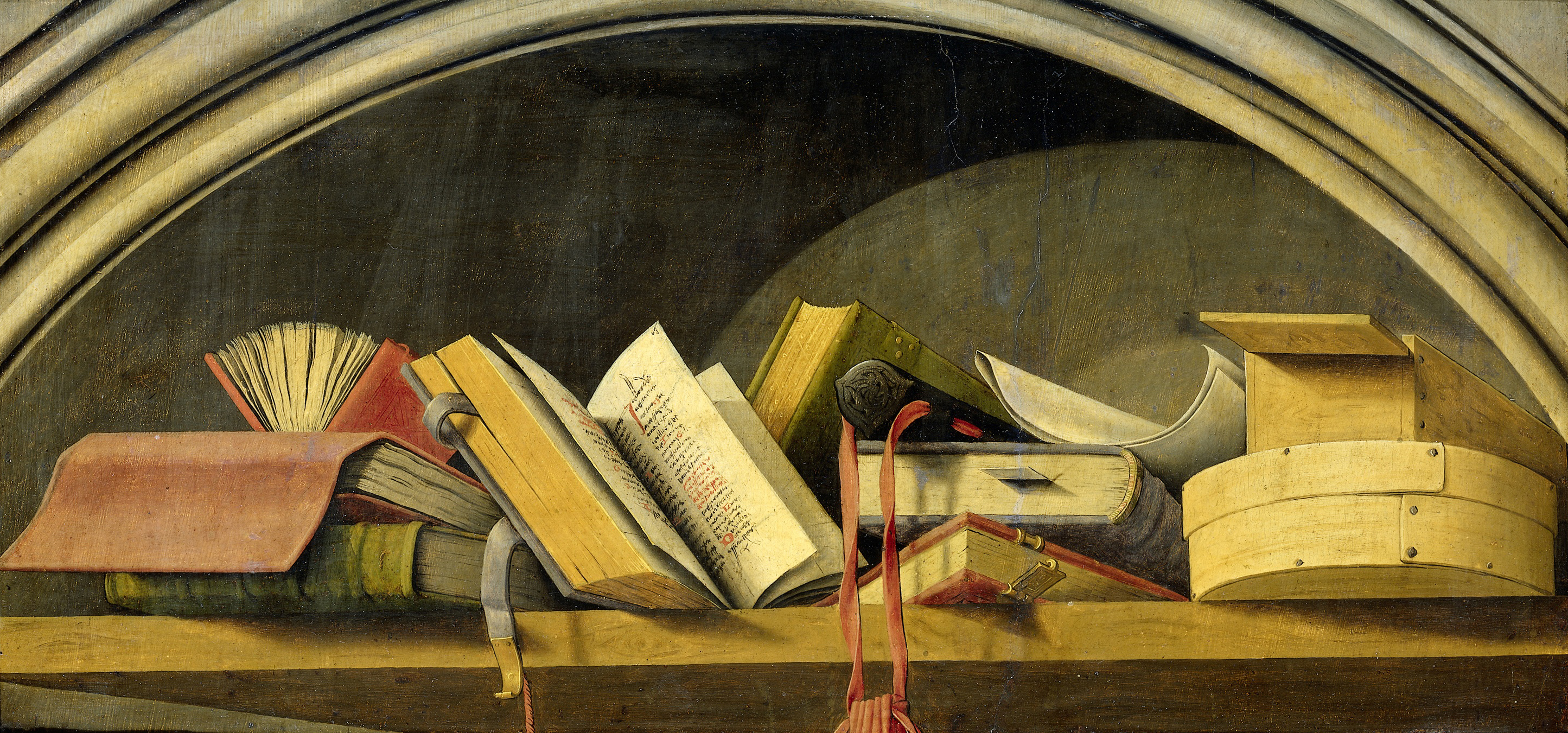
Still life with books, upper portion of the Isaiah panel (now in the Rijksmuseum).

== History ==
The work was commissioned by Pierre Corpici, a cloth-merchant who knew Barthélemy's stepfather, and combines influences from the Early Netherlandish art of Robert Campin and Jan van Eyck with those of Claus Sluter who worked at Dijon, and Colantonio from Naples (although some see this last influence as flowing in the other direction). Many of the iconographic details follow those from Annunciations by Jan van Eyck and his circle, such as the Washington Annunciation. Together with a fine portrait dated 1456 (Lichtenstein Collection, Vienna), and a fragment with a small crucified Christ in the Louvre, this is the only surviving panel painting associated with Barthélemy d'Eyck; most of his later works are illuminated manuscripts commissioned by René of Anjou.

== Description ==
The central panel depicts the Annunciation inside a Gothic church, the angel appearing under a vault. Above him, from a holed rose window, God and two angels are coming in, while the Madonna is kneeling at the right, with two painted naves in the background.

When used as an altarpiece, side panels of the triptych would be kept closed most of the time, displaying a Noli me tangere scene with kneeling Mary Magdalene on the left and Christ walking away from her on the right. The two panels do not form a continuous scene, however; Mary Magdalene is placed among lush green hills, while Christ is surrounded by a more desolate, desert-like landscape. Both Brussels and Rotterdam panels are painted on both sides, the reverse of the Amsterdam fragment does not survive.

Like in other contemporary Flemish paintings, the figures are far larger than expected when compared to the background. The wide clothes show the inspiration by the Burgundian school. The light is of clearly Flemish derivation (Robert Campin), such as (although with some Provençal elements) the minute details, including the winged devil and the bat in the left arch.

== Sources ==
- Zuffi, Stefano (2004). Il Quattrocento. Milan: Electa.
