= Barthélemy d'Eyck =

15th-century Dutch illustrator

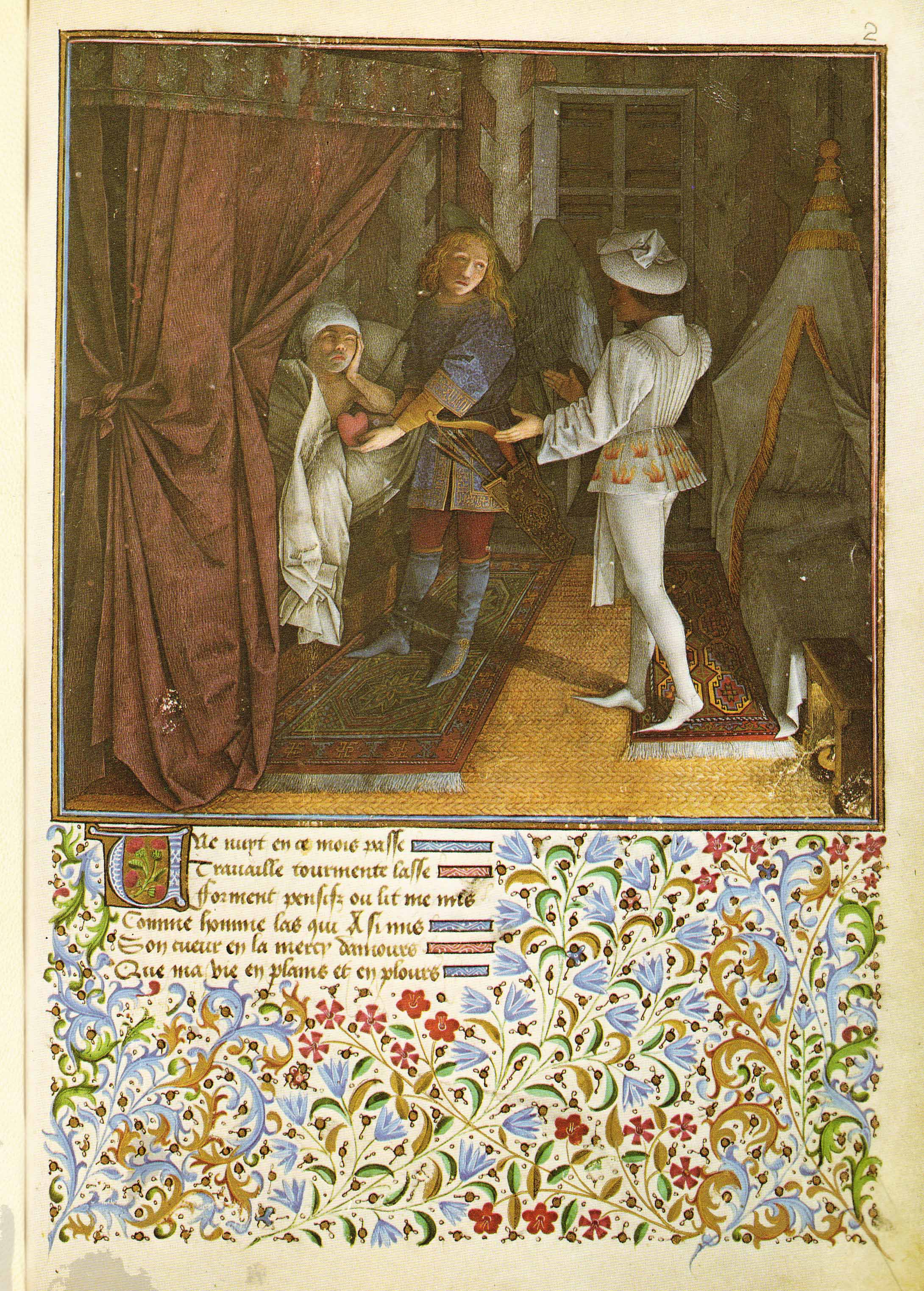
Miniature from the Livre du cœur d'amour épris.

Barthélemy d'Eyck, van Eyck or d' Eyck (c. 1420 – after 1470), was an Early Netherlandish artist who worked in France and probably in Burgundy as a painter and manuscript illuminator. He was active between about 1440 to about 1469. Although no surviving works can be certainly documented as his, he was praised by contemporary authors as a leading artist of the day, and a number of important works are generally accepted as his. In particular, Barthélemy has been accepted by most experts as the artist formerly known as the Master of the Aix Annunciation for paintings, and the Master of René of Anjou for illuminated manuscripts. He is thought by many to be the Master of the Shadows responsible for parts of the calendar of the Très Riches Heures du Duc de Berry.

== Biography ==
It is likely that he was related to Jan van Eyck but this cannot be documented. His stepfather was a cloth-merchant who followed René of Anjou to Naples and the South of France. His mother died in 1460, and was described as "Ydria Exters d'Allemagne" – that is "of Germany", which might well have included all the Netherlands as far as the Provençals were concerned. Jan van Eyck's brother, Lambert, seems also to have worked in Provence after Jan's death.

Some authorities have proposed, on stylistic grounds as well as the likely family relationship, that Barthélemy trained in the workshop of Jan van Eyck, and worked in the 1430s on the Milan-Turin Hours, a famous and important illuminated manuscript, where a number of different painting "hands" have been identified. Much of this only survives in black-and-white photographs after the destruction of its Turin portion in a fire in 1904. A painter called only "Barthélemy" is documented as working in Dijon for Philip the Good, Duke of Burgundy in 1440; this may well be him. René of Anjou, who was to become Barthélemy's major patron, had been held prisoner there by Philip. By 1444 Barthélemy d'Eyck was in Aix-en-Provence in the South of France presumably working with the leading French painter Enguerrand Quarton as they witnessed a legal document together.

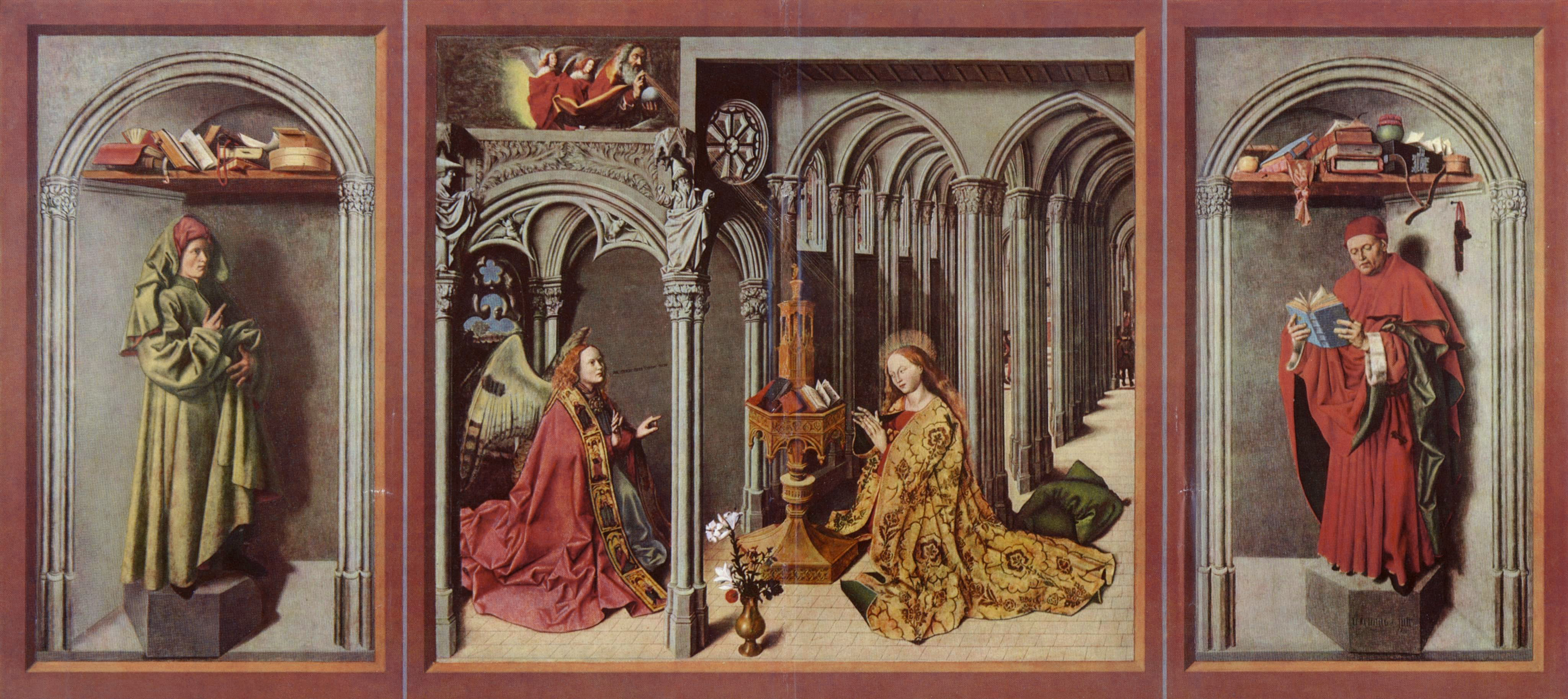
The Aix Annunciation, c. 1443–45

The Aix Annunciation, dating from 1443 to 1445, is now generally accepted as being by Barthélemy. It is a triptych, now dispersed between Aix-en-Provence, Brussels, Amsterdam and Rotterdam (one of the side-panels having been cut into two pieces). It was commissioned by a cloth-merchant who knew Barthélemy's stepfather, and combines influences from the Early Netherlandish art of Robert Campin and Jan van Eyck with those of Claus Sluter who worked at Dijon, and Colantonio from Naples (although some see this last influence as flowing in the other direction). Many of the iconographic details follow those from Annunciations by Jan van Eyck and his circle, such as the Washington Annunciation. Together with a fine portrait dated 1456 (Lichtenstein Collection, Vienna), and a fragment with a small crucified Christ in the Louvre, this is the only surviving panel painting associated with him; most of his later works are illuminated manuscripts commissioned by René of Anjou.

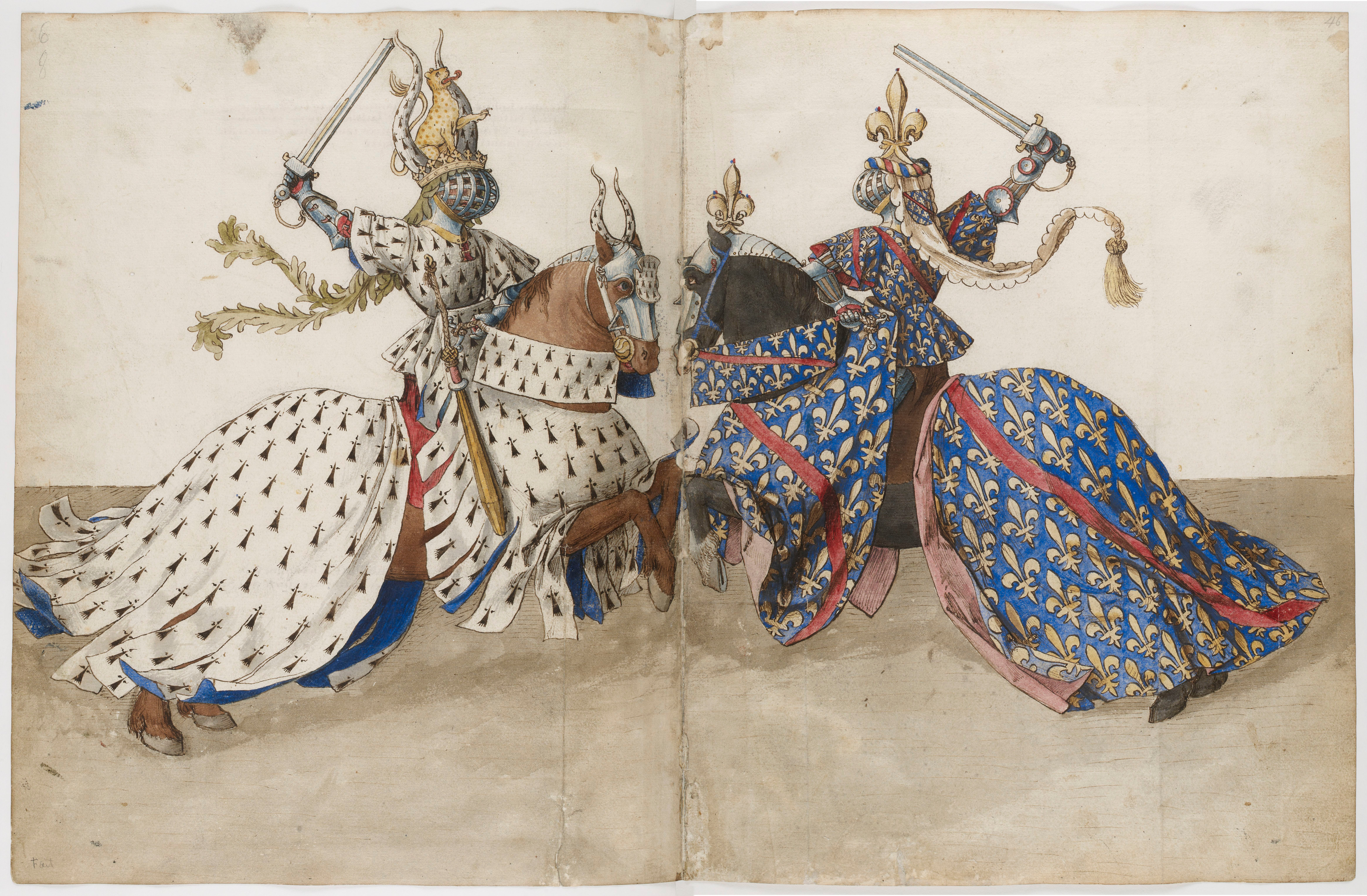
Page from Le Livre des tournois (BnF Ms Fr 2695)

René of Anjou was a prince of the Valois family who had a complicated range of titles and claims, including that of King of Naples, from which kingdom he was ejected by the House of Trastámara by 1442. There is evidence that Barthélemy either went to Naples, or that his works were known there, as his influence has been detected in the work of the Neapolitan artists Niccolò Antonio Colantonio and Antonello da Messina. René preferred to live in his territories in the South of France, or in the Loire Valley, and was a poet and amateur artist of some talent. For a long time he was thought personally responsible for the manuscript illuminations now generally attributed to Barthélemy. From about 1447 Barthélemy appears in surviving accounts as "peintre et varlet de chambre" – the same positions as Jan van Eyck held with Philip the Bold (and the Limbourg brothers had held with the Duke of Berry). A "varlet de chambre" was a court appointment of considerable status as a personal attendant to René. He travelled with René to Guyenne and on several occasions to Angers. Between 1447 and 1449 his workroom was next to René's private apartments, suggesting a considerable and unusual degree of closeness to his patron. His last appearance in the accounts is in 1469, when he was paid his own salary, plus that of three servants or assistants, and three horses. There is some evidence he lived until 1476.

== Manuscripts ==
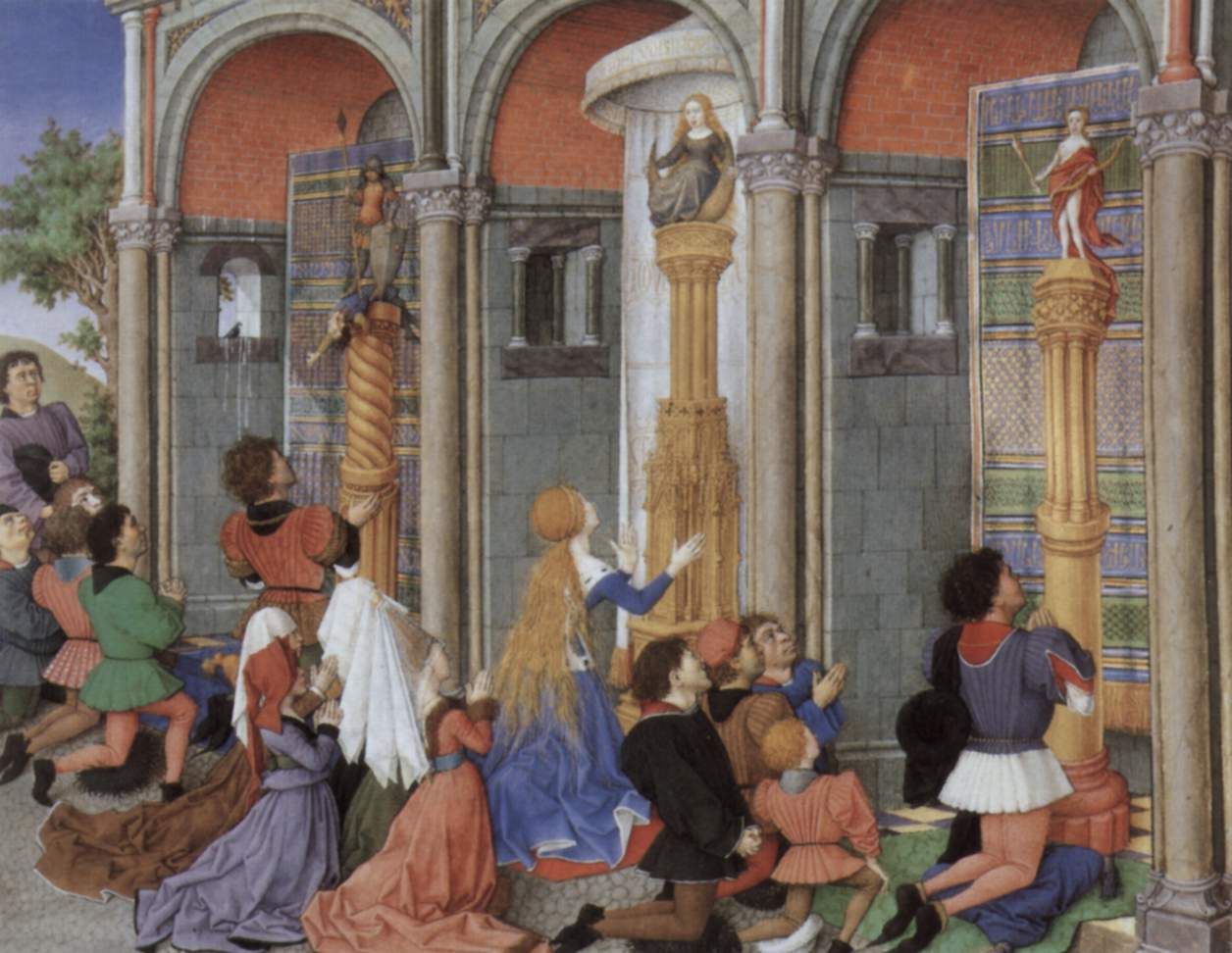
Emilia, Arcite, and Palamon worship at the shrines of the Gods – from the Théséide

Surviving illuminated works attributed to Barthélemy include a Book of Hours (M.358) in the Morgan Library in New York, on which Quarton also worked, and five miniatures added to The London Hours of René of Anjou in the British Library which relate very personally and intensely to René's unhappy situation whilst imprisoned in Dijon. Harthan suggests the designs for these may have been sketched by René himself for Barthélemy to execute: "the faithful interpreter of the King's exalted ideas, an inseparable, discreet companion and the effective partner, perhaps, in joint artistic enterprises".

The two best-known manuscripts are the Livre du cueur d'amour esprit and the Théséide, both in Vienna (Österreichische Nationalbibliothek, Codex 2597, 2617), dating from 1460 to 1470, with sixteen and seven miniatures respectively. The Livre du cueur d'amour esprit was a courtly allegorical romance written (almost certainly) by René. This has spaces reserved for a further twenty-nine miniatures, and these are all completed in another manuscript by a much less brilliant artist, probably working from Barthélemy's drawings. This chivalric allegorical romance comes near the end of that tradition, and only allows Barthélemy's realism and human sympathy to be engaged in places. His exceptional skill at lighting effects is fully deployed; four of the sixteen miniatures are night scenes, and others show dawn or dusk with great brilliance. The larger and more populated scenes of the French translation of Boccaccio's Il Teseida delle nozze d'Emilia, in theory about Theseus, in practice another romance, include magnificent scenes of urban life.

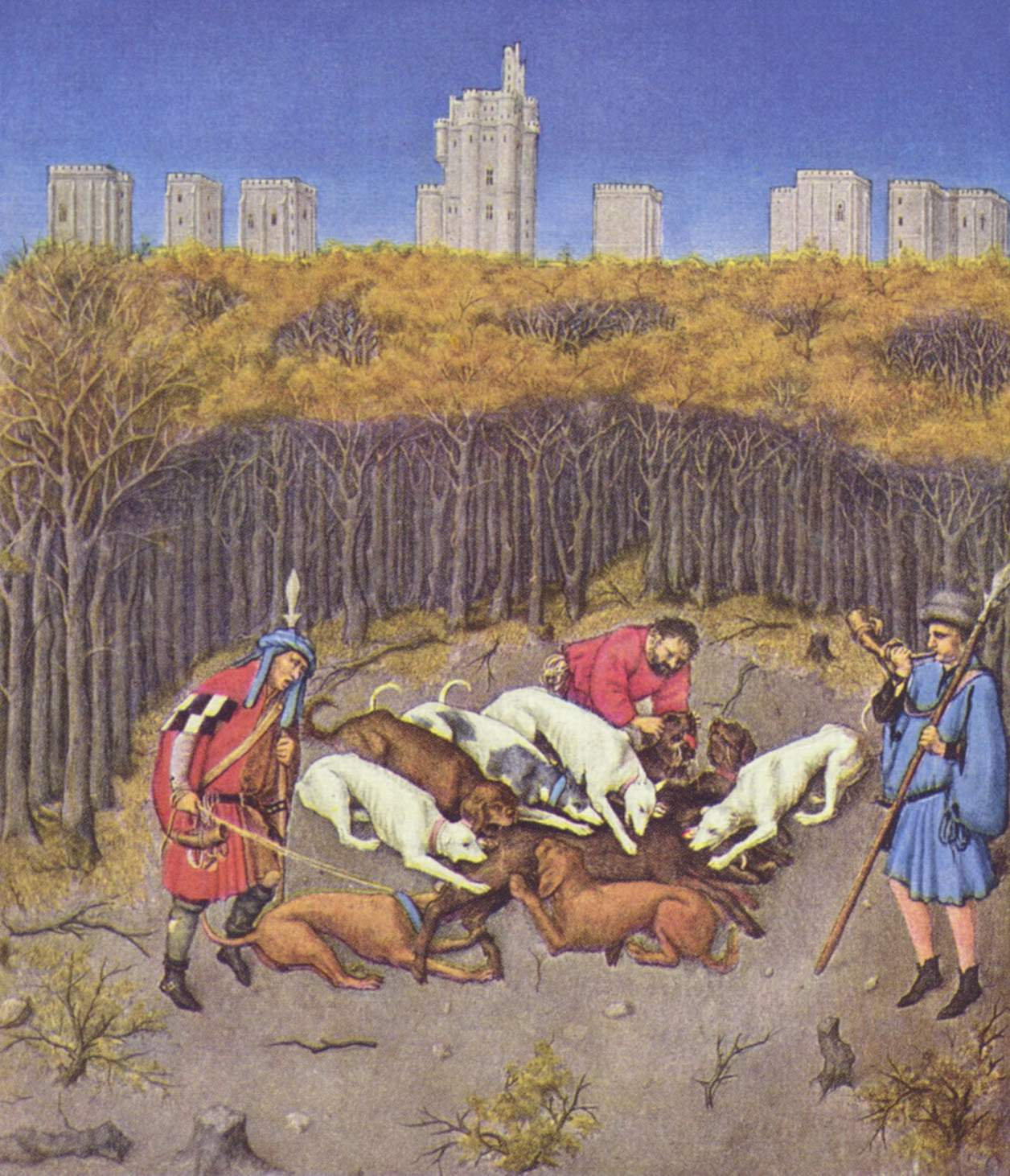
December from the calendar of the Très Riches Heures

A slightly earlier work, again illustrating a text by René, is the King René's Tournament Book (BnF Ms Fr 2695) which is unusual in being in watercolour, rather than tempera and on paper rather than vellum.

He is also believed by many art historians to be the Master of the Shadows who added to the illustration of the Très Riches Heures du Duc de Berry in the mid 15th century, long after the Limbourg brothers had produced the most famous miniatures (they and the Duke died in 1416, leaving the manuscript unfinished and unbound). By then the book may have belonged to René. The calendar scene for September, probably only partly by this master, shows the chateau at Saumur, which René owned, and where he spent much of the 1460s. He also painted the main calendar scenes for March (perhaps only in part), October and December. His spatial awareness was greater than that of the Limbourgs, and he included shadows, which are a very marked feature of the miniatures of Barthélemy. His faces, especially those of peasants, are more sharply individualised, although his figures are less elegant. Only these calendar scenes, and possibly the faces in the double-page Procession of St Gregory (Walther & Wolf, op cit), show his style; many other miniatures were added a generation later by Jean Colombe.

== Sources ==
- Tolley, Thomas (2001). "Eyck, Barthélemy d'". In Hugh Brigstocke (ed.). The Oxford Companion to Western Art. Oxford: Oxford University Press. ISBN 0-19-866203-3.
