= Annunciation (van Eyck, Madrid) =

C. 1435 oil painting by Jan van Eyck

The Annunciation
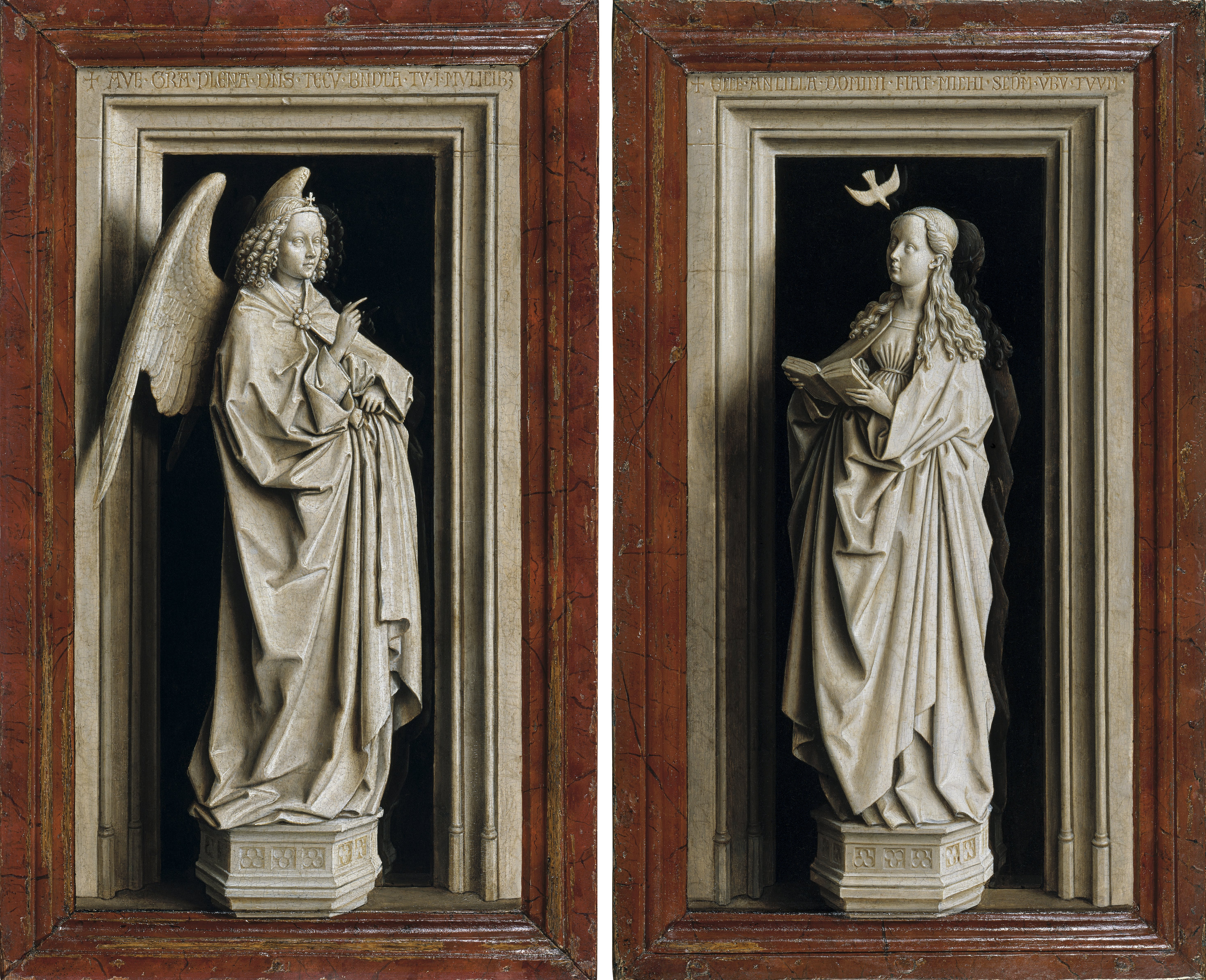
- Artist: Jan van Eyck
- Year: c. 1433–1435
- Medium: Oil on panel
- Dimensions: Each panel: 39 cm × 24 cm (15.4 in × 9.4 in)
- Location: Museo Thyssen-Bornemisza; Madrid

The Annunciation (sometimes The Annunciation Diptych) is an oil on wood in grisaille painting by the Early Netherlandish artist Jan van Eyck, dated by art historians as between around 1433 and 1435. The panels form a diptych, and are currently in the collection of the Museo Thyssen-Bornemisza, Madrid.

The figures and iconography are very similar to those in the outer panels of van Eyck's earlier Ghent Altarpiece completed in 1432. However, their relative small scale suggests commission for private worship rather than public celebration.

== Description ==
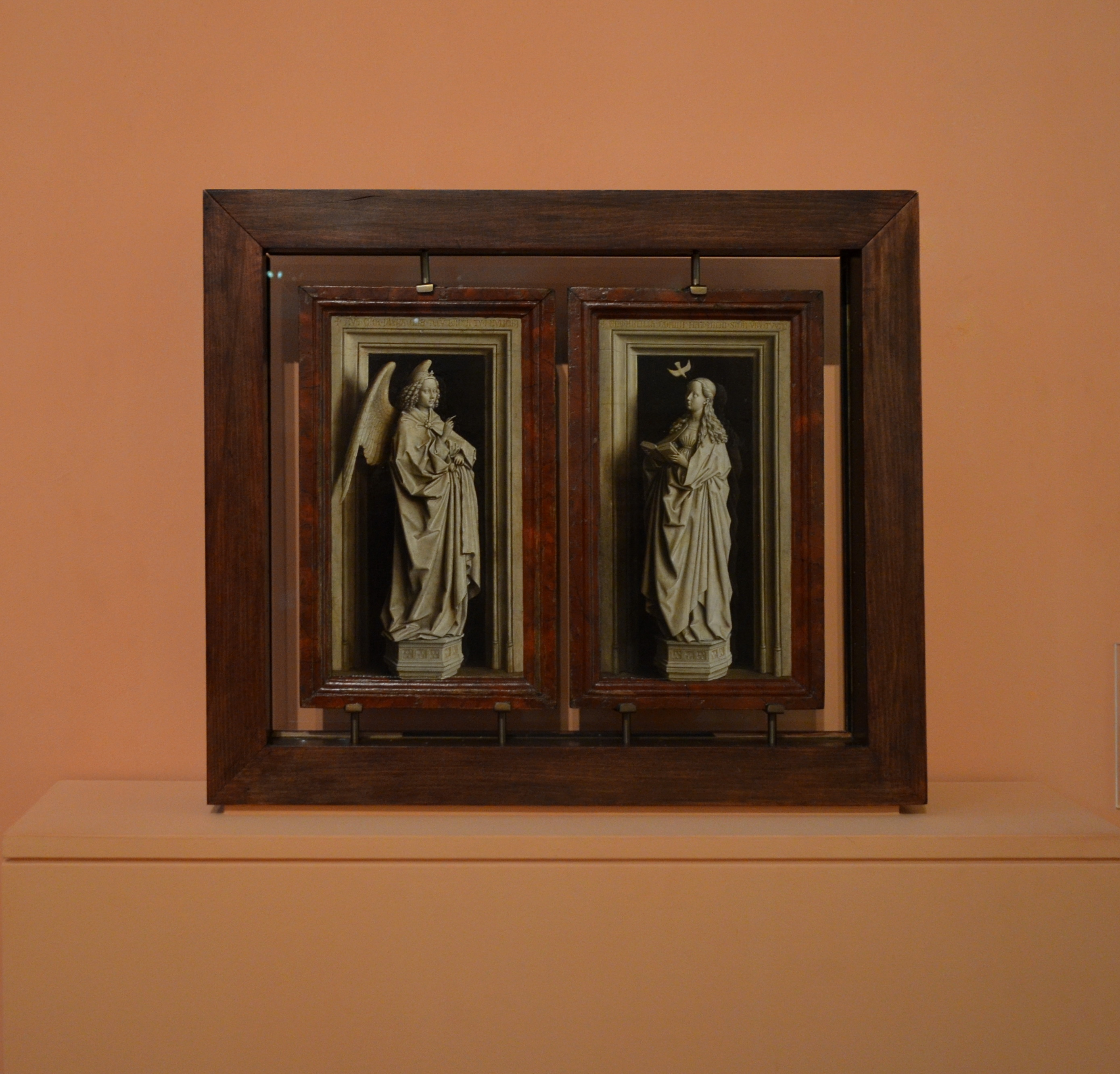
The panels in the Museo Thyssen-Bornemisza

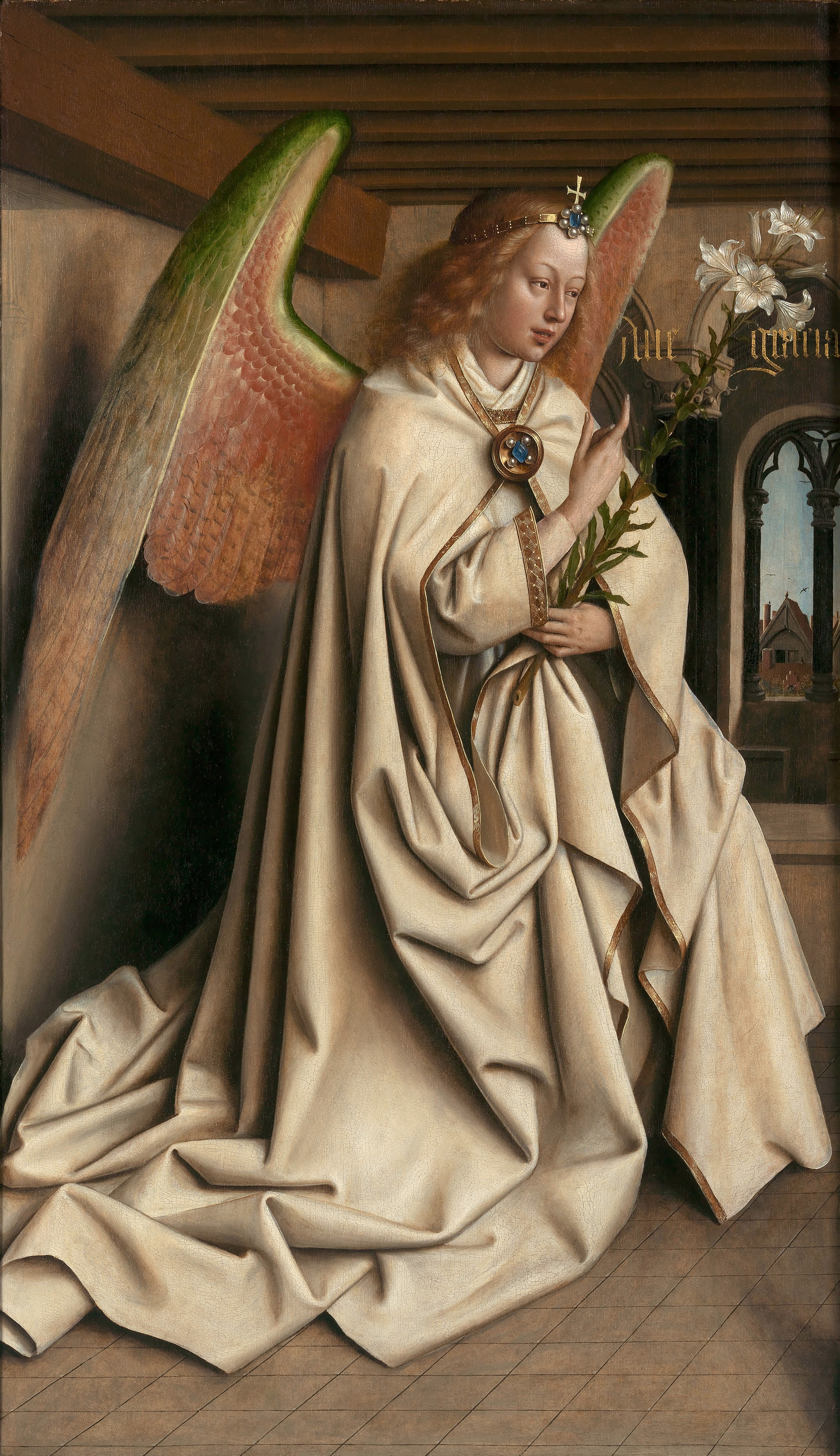
Ghent Altarpiece exterior: The Archangel Gabriel

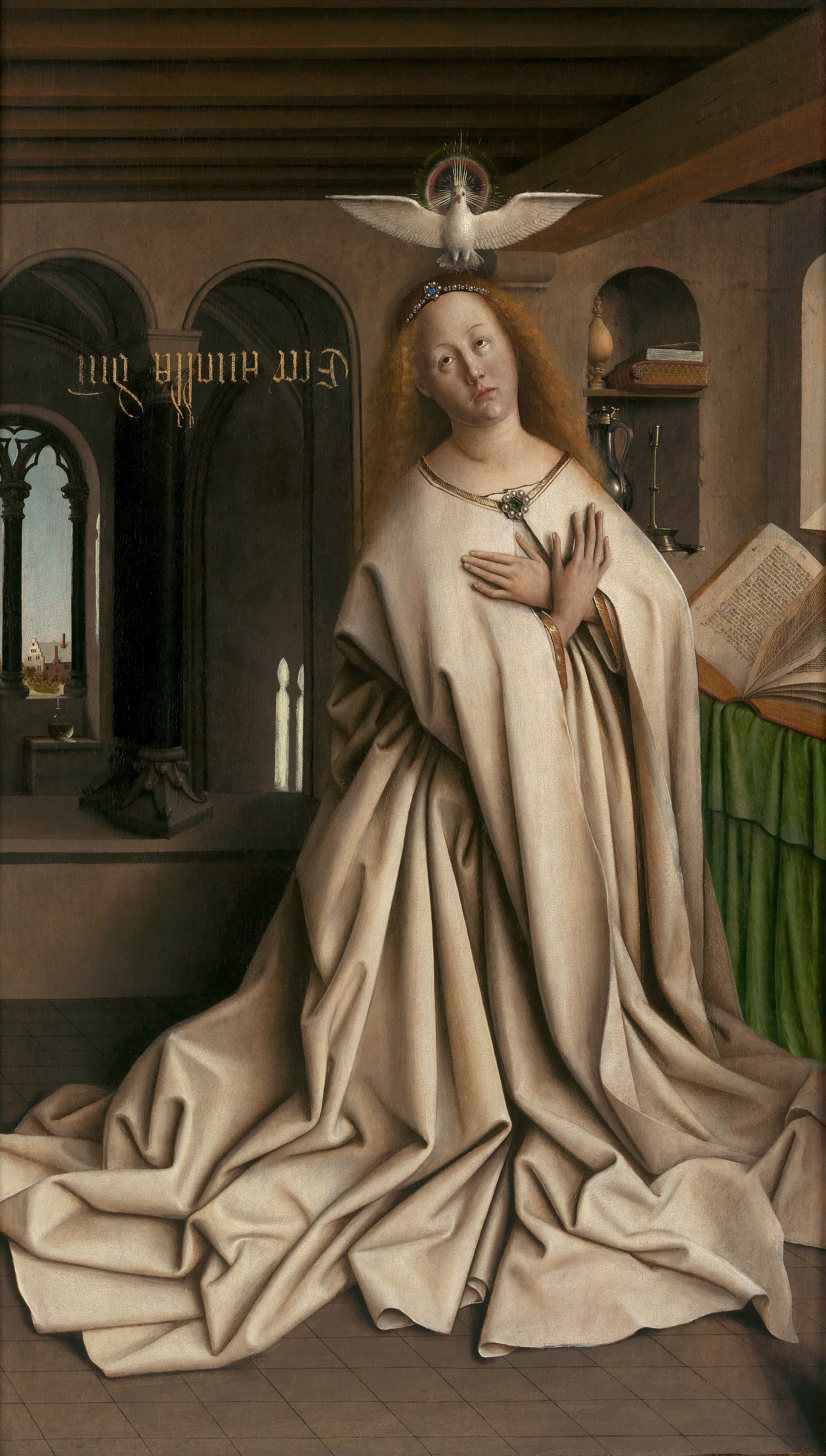
Ghent exterior: The Virgin Annunciate

The panels show the Archangel Gabriel on the left and the Virgin Mary on the right. Both are dressed in white robes. The figures of Mary and Gabriel are disproportionately large in relation to the scale of the rooms they occupy. Art historians agree that this follows the conventions of both the International Gothic and late Byzantine traditions of the icon by showing saints, especially Mary, in a much larger scale than their surroundings.

The saints are placed on carved and inscribed pedestals and architraves. Heavy foldings of lighting fall across the space they occupy and accentuates the heavy fold of their drapery. Mary holds her typical attribute of a holy book, while a dove hovers above her representing the purity and the Holy Spirit. Despite the dramatic setting and black marble background, the figures are given northern renaissance naturalistic poses and very human gestures.

The diptych is highly illusionistic. The predominant colours are multi-layered shades of white and black, intended to mimic stone sculpture creating a sense of living statues. The painted frames and mouldings are very early examples of trompe-l'œil, with faux spoken inscriptions. They contain the words of the Angel and Mary (from Luke 1: 26–38), and read; by the Archangel: Hail, full of grace, the Lord is with thee, and from Mary: ('Behold the handmaiden of the Lord; be it unto me according to thy word.

== Attribution ==
If the attribution is accepted, it is placed as very early in his career and probably as two outer wings of a triptych; the Annunciation in Washington has a far more accomplished treatment and more likely intended as a complete work.

== See also ==
- Annunciation (van Eyck, Washington)
- Ghent Altarpiece
- List of works by Jan van Eyck
