= Annunciation (van Eyck, Washington) =

Painting by Jan van Eyck

The Annunciation
- Artist: Jan van Eyck
- Year: c. 1434-1436
- Medium: Oil transferred from panel to canvas
- Dimensions: 90.2 cm × 34.1 cm (35.5 in × 13.4 in)
- Location: National Gallery of Art, Washington, D.C.
- Accession: 1937.1.39

The Annunciation is an oil painting by the Early Netherlandish master Jan van Eyck, from around 1434–1436. The panel is housed in the National Gallery of Art in Washington, D.C. It was originally on panel but has been transferred to canvas. It is thought that it was the left (inner) wing of a triptych; there has been no sighting of the other wings since before 1817. The Annunciation is a highly complex work whose iconography is still debated by art historians. It was bought by the Tsar of Russia for the Hermitage Museum, but was sold by Stalin's government in 1930.

The picture depicts the Annunciation by the Archangel Gabriel to the Virgin Mary that she will bear the son of God (Luke 1:26–38). The inscription shows his words: AVE G̅R̅A̅ PLENA ('Hail, full of grace...'). She modestly draws back and responds, ECCE ANCILLA D̅[O̅M̅I̅]N̅I̅ ('Behold the handmaiden of the Lord'). The words appear upside down because they are directed to God and are therefore inscribed with a God's-eye view. The seven gifts of the Holy Spirit descend to her on seven rays of light from the upper window to the left, with the dove symbolizing the Holy Spirit following the same path; "[t]his is the moment God's plan for salvation is set in motion. Through Christ's human incarnation the old era of the Law is transformed into a new era of Grace".

== The Temple ==
Mary was believed in the Middle Ages to have been a very studious girl who was engaged by the Temple of Jerusalem with other selected maidens to spin new curtains for the Holy of Holies. The book she is reading here is too large to be a lady's Book of Hours; as in other paintings she is engaged in serious study in a part of the temple. (One medieval authority specified that she was reading the Book of Isaiah when Gabriel arrived.) The van Eycks were almost the first to use this setting in panel painting, but it appears earlier in illuminated manuscripts and in an altarpiece of 1397 from the same monastery for which this painting was probably ordered.

The architecture moves from older, round Romanesque forms above, to (slightly) pointed Gothic arches below, with the higher levels largely in darkness, and the floor level well-lit. The gloom of the Old Covenant is about to be succeeded by the light of the New Covenant. The flat timber roof is in poor repair, with planks out of place. The use of Romanesque architecture to identify Jewish rather than Christian settings is a regular feature of the paintings of van Eyck and his followers, and other paintings show both styles in the same building in a symbolic way.

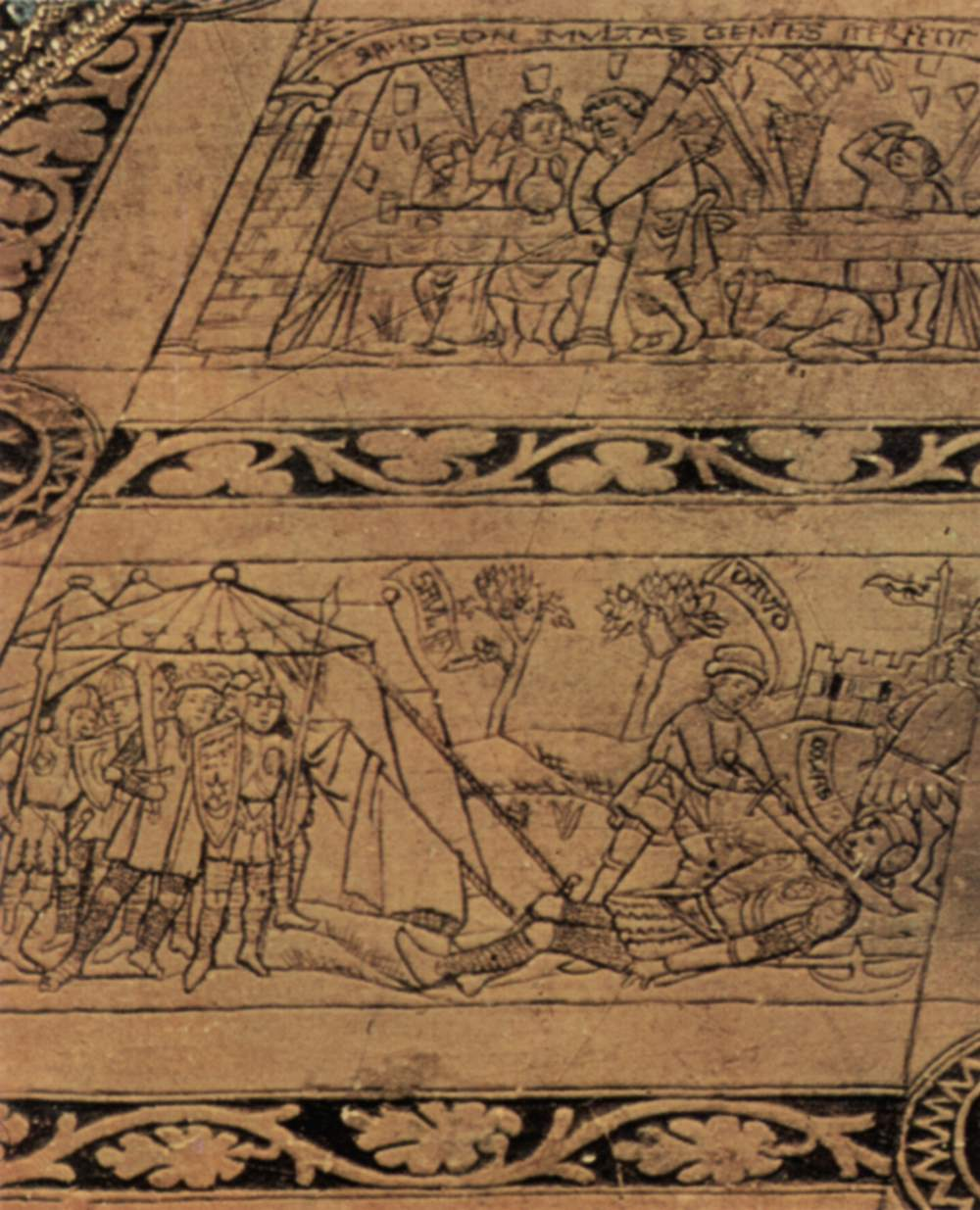
Floor tiles: David slaying Goliath in front, Samson pulling down the Philistines' Temple behind

The decoration of the temple is naturally all derived from the Old Testament, but the subjects shown are those believed in the Middle Ages to prefigure the coming of Christ the Messiah. In the floor tiles David's slaying of Goliath (centre front) foretells Christ's triumph over the devil. Behind this, Samson pulls down the Temple of the Philistines, prefiguring both the Crucifixion and the Last Judgement, according to medieval authorities. To the left, Delilah is cutting Samson's hair (Betrayal of Christ), and behind he slays the Philistines (Christ's triumph over sin). The death of Absalom and possibly that of Abimelech are identified by some art historians, although only tiny sections are visible. Erwin Panofsky, who developed much of this analysis, proposed a scheme for the significance of the astrological symbols in the round border tiles, and other versions have been suggested. Gabriel appears to be placed over the sign of Aries, the sign for the time of the Annunciation. The Virgin Mary stands over her own sign, Virgo.

The rear wall has a single stained glass window, where Jehovah stands, above triple plain-glazed windows below, which perhaps suggest the Christian Trinity. On either side of the single window are dim wall-paintings of the Finding of Moses by Pharaoh's daughter (left, pre-figuring the Annunciation itself), and Moses receiving the Ten Commandments (right, paralleling the New Covenant Christ would bring). Below them are roundels with Isaac and Jacob, for which various symbolic functions have been proposed. The lilies are a traditional attribute of Mary, standing for purity. The empty stool may be an "empty throne", a symbol for Christ going back to early Byzantine art.

== The figures ==
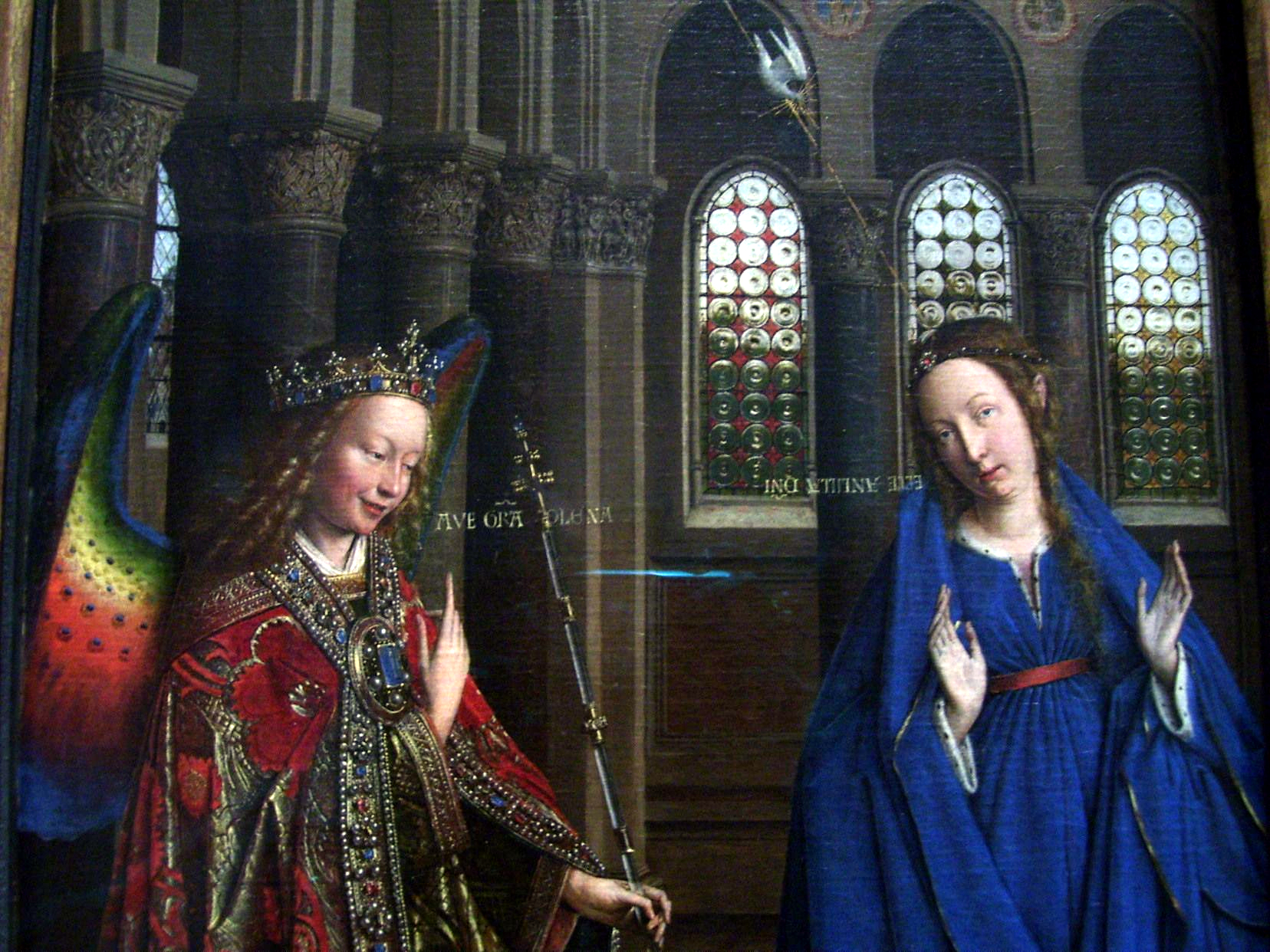
Detail – Mary and Gabriel

It has been suggested that Mary has been given the features of Isabella of Portugal, wife of Philip the Good, Duke of Burgundy, who may well have commissioned the painting from van Eyck, his (part-time) court painter. Mary wears a robe in her usual blue, which is trimmed in ermine, reserved for royalty, which would suit this theory, although the Middle Ages placed great emphasis on Mary's royal descent in any case. As is usual, especially in the North, Mary's features are less attractive than those of Gabriel; with his being a sexless angel there was considered to be no possibility of his beauty causing inappropriate thoughts in the onlooker. Neither figure has a halo – these were being dispensed with in Early Netherlandish art in the interests of realism; eventually the Italians would follow. Mary's posture is ambiguous; it is not clear if she is standing, kneeling or sitting.

=== Size ===
Many writers, including Hand, call the figures over-large compared to the architecture. This is certainly a feature of some of van Eyck's depictions of Mary in a Church setting, with a particular theological meaning. In the Madonna in the Church in the Gemäldegalerie, Berlin, where this theme is most developed, the figure of Mary is some sixty feet high, filling much of the height of a tall Gothic church. It is not so clear that any effect of this type is intended here; there are no architectural fittings to give a clear scale to the building. If, for example, the setting were a first-floor room, or one giving on to a courtyard, the windows might be lower than is normal in a medieval church. The size of the plain glass roundels does not seem disproportionate to the figures.

=== Sacramental themes ===
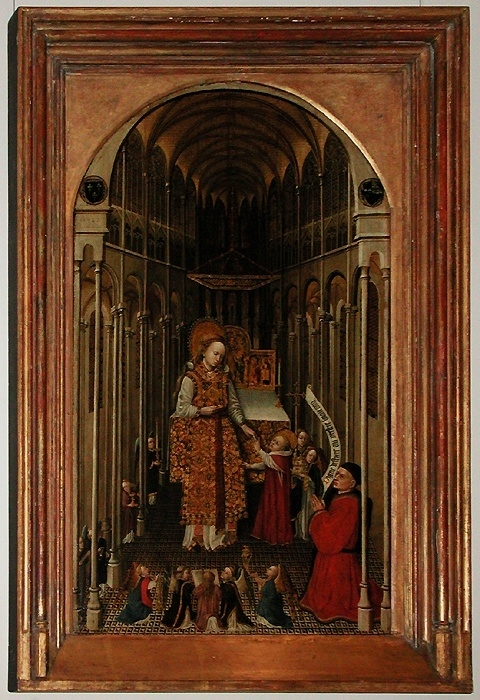
Le sacerdoce de la Vierge (The Priesthood of the Virgin), 1425–50, Louvre, unknown French artist

Another of van Eyck's themes, and one employed by other Early Netherlandish painters, is indicated by the large cope over a dalmatic worn by Gabriel. This would, in a human being, mark him as a celebrant or attendant at a High Mass. Mary is facing a table with a book upon it about the right size to be a Gospel Book or Missal, and has her hands raised in a gesture known as the expansis manibus. This is certainly to convey the alarm and uncertainty with which she usually greets the surprising apparition of Gabriel and his news, but is also a gesture used by a priest at certain points of a Mass. The painting has been connected with the Golden Mass ("Missa Aurea"), a liturgical drama, or dramatised Mass, popular in the Netherlands at the time, which included a staging of the Annunciation as the Gospel reading. More generally, this is part of a common theme in Early Netherlandish art where Mary, as intermediary between the faithful and God, is compared to, or seen as, a priest celebrating Mass. Her personal sacrifice of her son is compared to the ritual sacrifice enacted by the priest in the Mass. In a surviving extreme example in the Louvre she is shown clearly wearing vestments and celebrating mass at an altar; more often, as here, the comparison is made more subtly.

== Other panels of the triptych ==
The triptych would presumably have been an altarpiece for a side-altar or small chapel. The subjects of the other missing panels remain uncertain; a Nativity or Adoration of the Magi are considered most likely for the central panel, at least twice as wide as this one, with a Visitation of Mary or Presentation of Jesus on the right-hand wing matching this one. The outer sides of the wings would probably have been painted in some fashion, but if there was a full scene, or even a figure in grisaille on the back of this, it is unlikely it would have been discarded when the painting was transferred to canvas in the 19th century. No doubt the themes of this wing would originally have related to those in the other wings in ways we cannot now guess.

== Painting technique ==
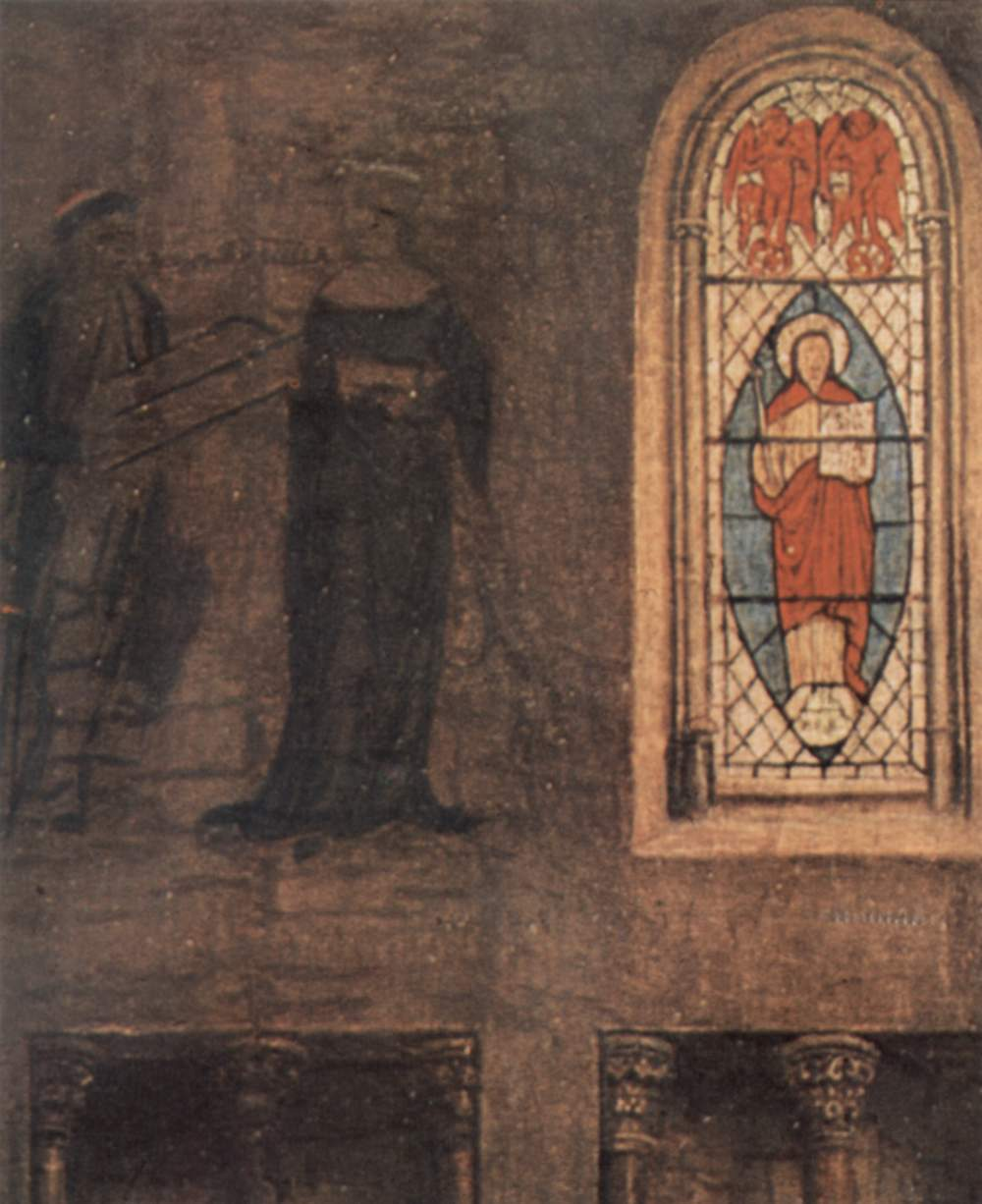
The rear wall: Moses found in the bullrushes on the wall, stained glass of Jehovah, with Seraphim above. The wall-painting is not in the underdrawing.

A cleaning in 1998, and examination by modern technical methods such as infrared reflectograms, has revealed much about van Eyck's technique here, which is consistent with other works of his such as the Arnolfini Portrait. His underdrawing has been revealed, and so have many changes made in the course of painting the work.

Van Eyck's superb oil painting technique is evident throughout. Gold leaf is only used for the seven rays coming in from the left; paint is used for all the gold on Gabriel, often worked wet-on-wet to achieve the textural effects of his brocaded clothes. In a shadowy area behind the stool van Eyck worked a glaze with his fingers. The play of light over the many different textures in the painting is brilliantly rendered, and the illusionistic detail, especially in Gabriel's rich costume, is exceptional.

Apart from several small changes in the position of hands and faces, the underdrawing shows that the small pilasters on the left wall were originally planned to be repeated on the rear wall, and to be much taller, reaching nearly to the roof, on both. The paint on the rear wall is thicker than on the left wall, so he may have painted the pilasters before changing his mind. In the underdrawing the ceiling planks are all in place, and there was also a light source to the right, for which the shadows are drawn.

The narrative scenes on the tiles replace a simpler decorative plan in the underdrawing, and the stool has become much larger. The vase of lilies was not only absent in the underdrawing, but was not reserved, that is to say that a space was not left for it in the paint for the Virgin's robe or the floor. This suggests it was only added late in the course of painting.

Examination of other major van Eyck works reveals similar developments from the underdrawing, and in the course of painting, in these works. It seems that van Eyck, perhaps acting with clerical advisers – although he appears to have been a considerable reader himself, liked to add further complexity to his compositions in the course of work on them.

== Condition and date ==
The painting was transferred from panel to canvas in the 19th century. It received a major cleaning in 1998, when varnish and some overpaint was removed, and a technical study undertaken. Writing before this, the NGA catalogue described the painting as extensively restored. Craquelure (fine cracking to the surface) had been painted over, especially in the background. Repainted areas included parts of Gabriel's face and hair, and the Virgin's robe, which appeared to have also lost a layer of glaze.

The range of dates given for the painting was previously from 1428–1429 (Panofsky and others) to 1436–1437, but the discovery in 1959 of a date of 1437 on an altarpiece in the Gemäldegalerie Alte Meister, Dresden, has considerably changed all dating of works by van Eyck, and "makes it all but impossible to continue dating the Annunciation before 1432" (Hand). The painting appears stylistically to come between the Ghent Altarpiece and late works such as the Berlin Virgin in a Church.

Two authorities have considered the painting to belong to Jan's brother Hubert van Eyck, who died in 1426. It is thought that the recent cleaning or technical investigation has tended to confirm the majority view that it is an autograph work by Jan.

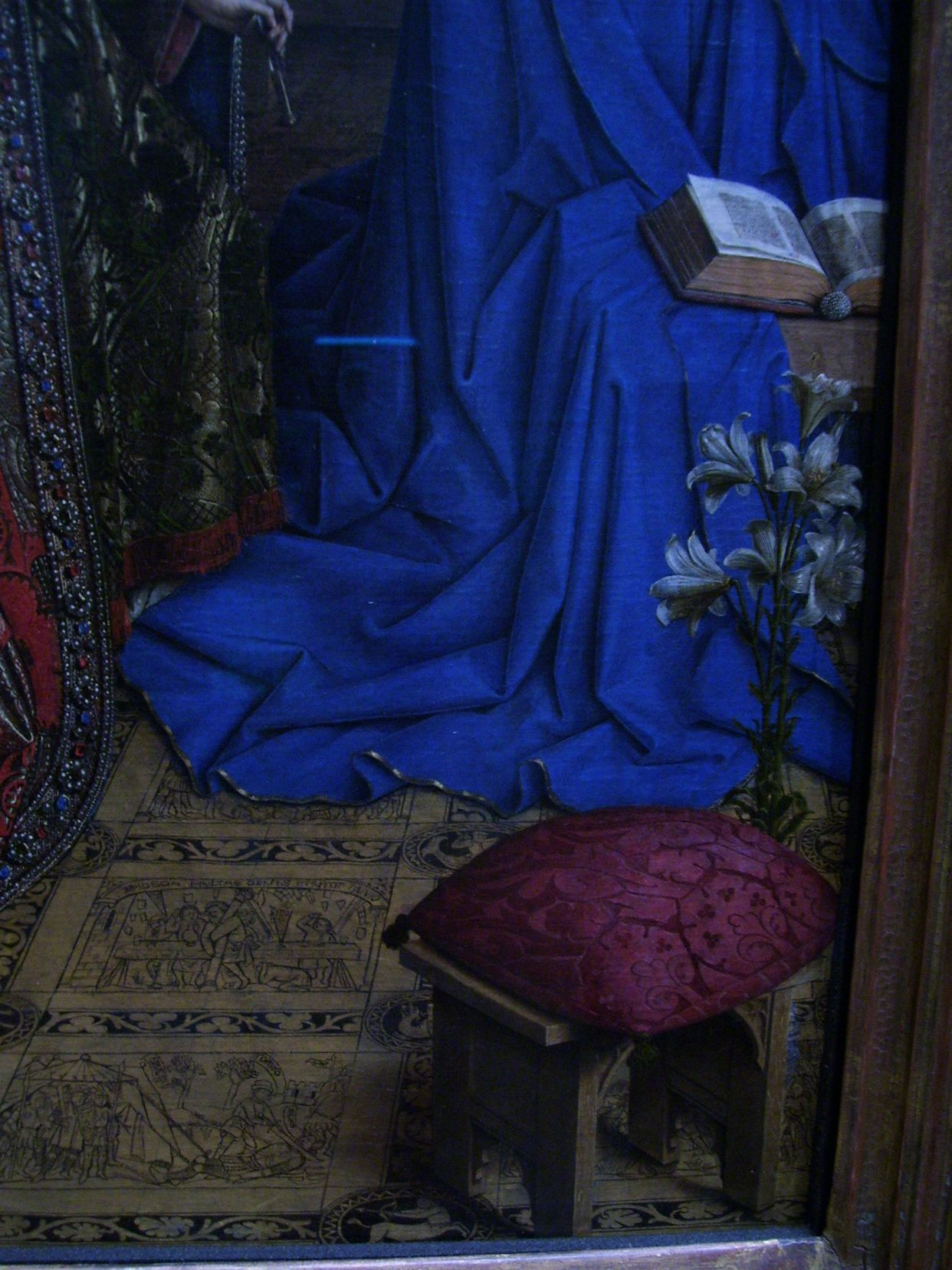
Detail with the lily, the stool and the floor.

== Provenance ==
The provenance of the painting, as far as it is known, is:

- 1791 – A visitor to the Chartreuse de Champmol, a Carthusian monastery in Dijon, now in France, but in the 15th century the capital of the Duchy of Burgundy, recorded seeing in the Prior's room paintings, originally in the ducal chapel of the monastery: "... paintings on wood of the type of the earliest Flemish painters, which come from the chapels of the Dukes; they are about four feet high. The first, about a foot wide, is an Annunciation..." The monastery was very largely destroyed in the French Revolution, but had been the burial place of the Dukes of Burgundy, and contained many important works. The painting mentioned is thought likely to be the Washington painting, although the measurements (in the French pied, or foot, of the period) do not match very exactly.
- 1817 – Bought at an auction sale in Paris by the major dealer C. J. Nieuwenhuys of Brussels, who sold it to William II, King of the Netherlands. In Brussels until 1841, then in The Hague. In a book of 1843 Nieuwenhuys says of the picture that it was "from a set with two others by the same master, painted for Philip the Good and destined to adorn a religious foundation in Dijon". A modern scholar has also claimed that the Virgin has the features of Philip's Duchess Isabella of Portugal.
- 1850 – Lot 1 in an auction in The Hague, bought by Czar Nicholas I of Russia for the Hermitage Museum in Saint Petersburg. Probably between 1864 and 1870 the Hermitage transferred it to canvas, as is often done with panel paintings when the wood develops problems.
- 1929 – Franz Matthiesen, a young German art dealer, was asked by the Soviet Government to compile a list of the hundred paintings in Russian collections which should never be sold under any circumstances. He was most surprised to be shown several of these paintings not long afterward in Paris by Calouste Gulbenkian, who had traded them with the Russians for oil. Gulbenkian wanted him to act as his agent on further purchases, but Matthiesen instead formed a consortium with Colnaghi's of London and Knoedler & Co. of New York, which in 1930 and 1931 bought paintings and other works from the Russians, of which twenty-one paintings were bought by Andrew Mellon, who had been offered first refusal. All are now in the National Gallery of Art in Washington, where they form some of the most important paintings in the collection (two works by Raphael, also including works by Botticelli, Titian, Veronese, Velázquez, Rembrandt).
- 1930 – Bought by Andrew Mellon via the consortium described above. In 1931 it was deeded to the Mellon Trust, which gifted it in 1937 to the National Gallery of Art, whose construction began in that year.

== Gallery ==
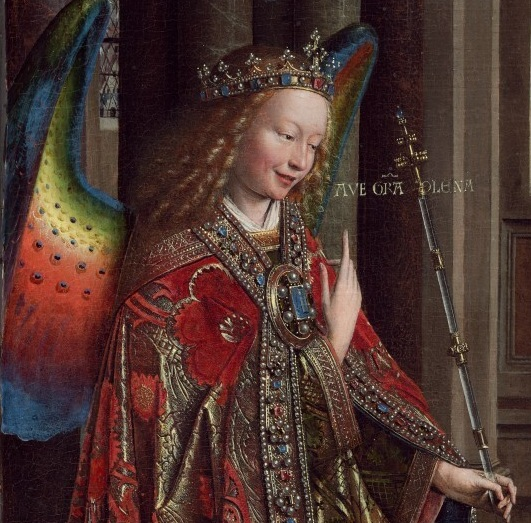
Gabriel

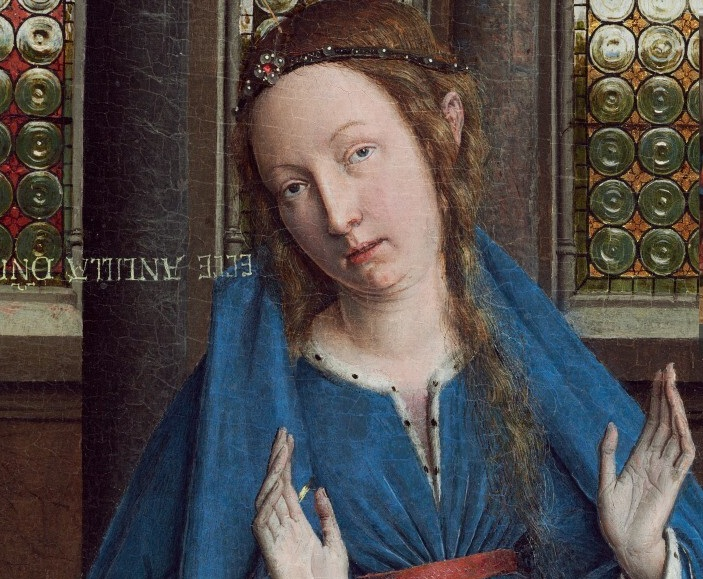
Mary

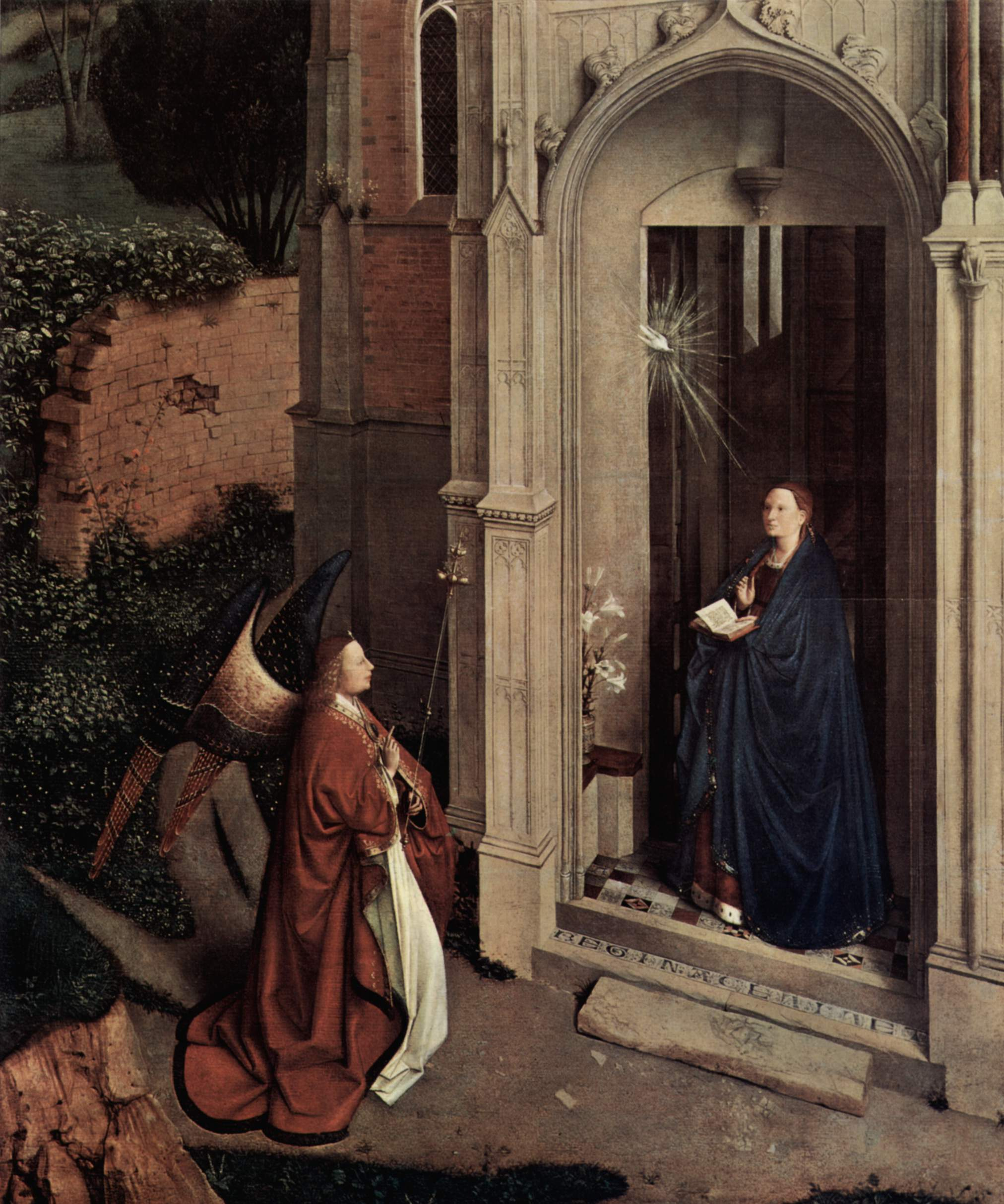
Circle of van Eyck, or Petrus Christus. The Friedsam Annunciation from the Metropolitan; the right side of the doorway is Romanesque (Old Covenant), and the left Gothic (New Covenant). The garden is overgrown, with the outer wall falling down.

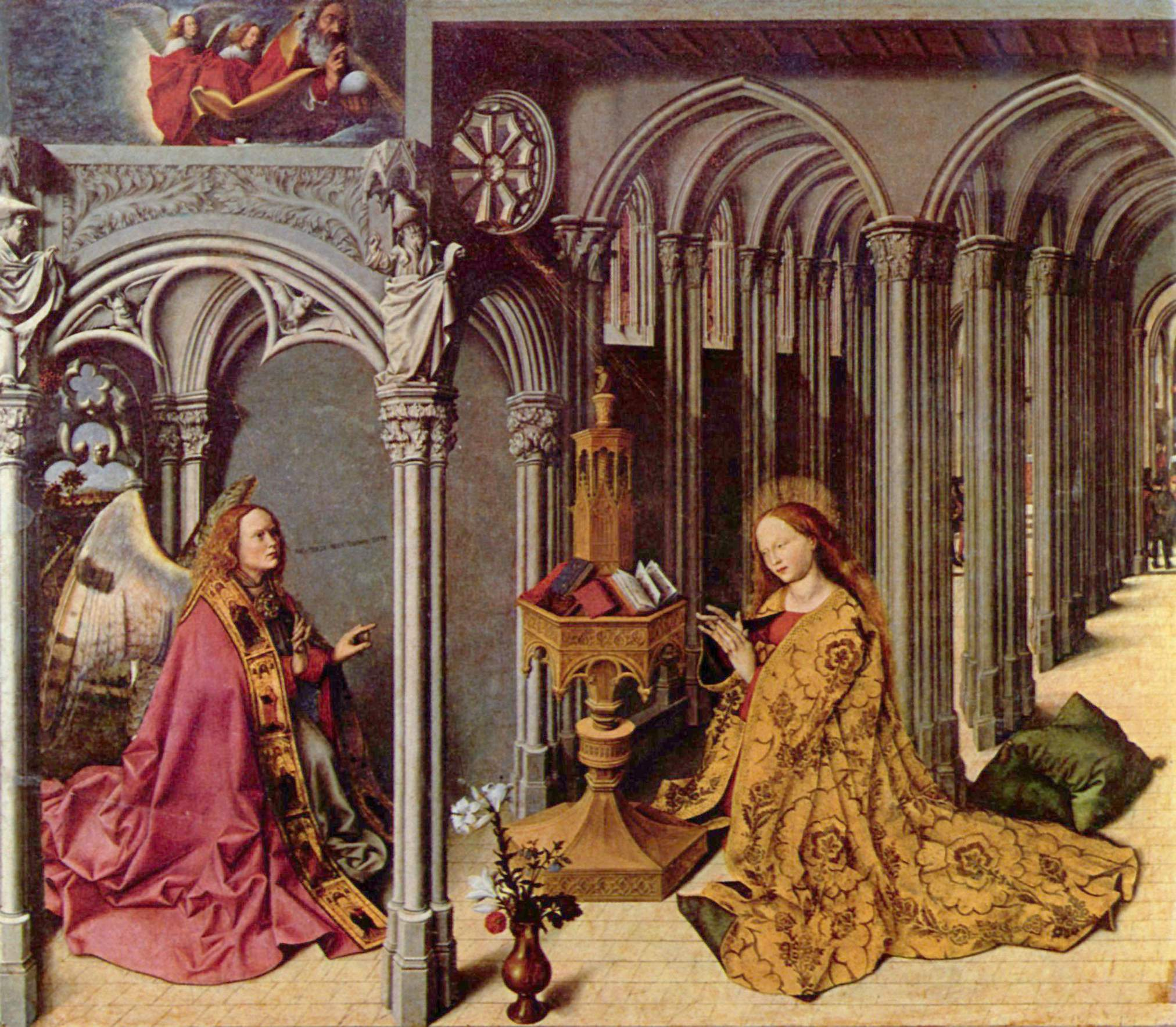
The Aix Annunciation, generally attributed to Barthélemy van Eyck, presumed to be related to Jan, with many similarities in the treatment.

== See Also ==
- Annunciation (van Eyck, Madrid)
- Ghent Altarpiece
- List of works by Jan van Eyck
