= Colantonio =

General contractor headquartered in Holliston, Massachusetts

Colantonio Inc.
- Industry: General contractor
- Founded: 1978
- Headquarters: Holliston, Massachusetts (HQ)
- Area served: New England
- Key people: Francis P Colantonio (Chairman and Chief Executive Officer); George Willwerth II (President)
- Products: Construction Management; Pre-construction Services
- Revenue: $128,000,000
- Website: http://www.colantonioinc.com/

Colantonio is a general contractor headquartered in Holliston, Massachusetts. The firm offers preconstruction, general contracting, and construction management services with specialization in academic, affordable housing, municipal, and historical restoration markets.

== Notable work ==
=== State House Senate Chamber renovations ===
Colantonio. partnered with the Division of Capital Asset Management and Maintenance, the Bureau of the State House and CBT Architects to restore the historic Senate Chamber of the Massachusetts State House in Boston. The project received the 2020 Associated General Contractors Build America Award; the 2019 Associated General Contractors of Massachusetts Build NE Performance Award; the 2019 Boston Society of Architects Accessible Design Award; and the 2019 Massachusetts Historical Commission Award for Rehabilitation & Restoration.

=== Fitchburg Yarn Works ===
Colantonio renovated the historic Fitchburg Yarn Mill in Fitchburg, Massachusetts into the 96-unit Yarn Works Apartments for WinnCompanies with designer The Architectural Team. The building was added to the National Register of Historic Places on December 6, 2016. The project received the 2018 Massachusetts Historical Commission Award for Rehabilitation and Restoration and the 2019 Preservation Massachusetts Mayor Thomas M. Menino Legacy Award.

=== Marathon Elementary School ===
Colantonio built the new Marathon Elementary School in Hopkinton, Massachusetts. The firm partnered with Compass Project Management and DRA Architects to build the 88,700 sq ft (8,240 m^{2}) facility for the town's 475 pre-K, kindergarten, and first-grade students. The project is LEED Silver Certified by the U.S. Green Building Council.

=== New Public Works facility ===
Colantonio built a new public works facility in Medway, Massachusetts in partnership with Compass Project Management and Helene Karl Architects. Its expansive photovoltaic array system was designed to provide one hundred percent of the building’s energy needs and will seek zero energy certification by the International Living Future Institute.
