= List of Spanish architects =

Following is a list of architects from the country of Spain.

== A–M ==
- Vicente Acero (c.1675/1680–1739)
- Martín de Aldehuela (1729–1802)
- Martín de Andújar Cantos (born 1602)
- Juan Bautista Antonelli (1550–1616)
- Claudio de Arciniega (c. 1520–1593)
- Juan Martín Cermeño (1700–1773)
- Alberto Campo Baeza (born 1946)
- Jerónimo Balbás (18th century)
- José Banús
- Francisco Becerra (c. 1545–1605)
- Francesc Berenguer i Mestres (1866–1914)
- Alonso Berruguete (1488–1561)
- Ricardo Bofill (1939–2022)
- Jaume Busquets (1904–1968)
- Santiago Calatrava (born 1951)
- Nerea Calvillo (born 1973)
- Félix Candela (1910–1997)
- Alonso Cano (1601–1667)
- Julio Cano Lasso (1920–1996)
- Jerónimo Cuervo González (1838–1898)
- Antoni Bonet Castellana
- José Benito de Churriguera (1665–1725)
- Josep Antoni Coderch (1913–1984)
- Simón de Colonia (died 1511)
- Alonso de Covarrubias
- Francisco de Cubas
- Josep Domènech i Estapà (1858–1917)
- Lluís Domènech i Montaner (1850–1923)
- Rita Fernández Queimadelos (1911–2008)
- Damián Forment (1480–1540)
- Justo Gallego Martínez (1925–2021)
- Luis de Garrido (born 1960)
- Antoni Gaudí (1852–1926)
- Rodrigo Gil de Hontañón (1500–1577)
- Juan Gil de Hontañón (1480–1526)
- Bernardo Giner de los Ríos (1888–1970)
- Juan Gómez de Mora (1586–1648)
- Vicente Guallart
- Juan Guas (c. 1430–1433–c. 1496)
- Rafael Guastavino (famous in United States)
- Juan de Herrera (1530–1597)
- Francisco Herrera the Younger (1622–1685)
- Fernando Higueras (1930–2008)
- Andrés Jaque (born 1971)
- Josep Maria Jujol (1879–1949)
- Pedro Machuca (c. 1490–1550)
- Manuel Martin Madrid (born 1938)
- César Manrique (1919–1992)
- Joan Margarit i Consarnau
- Jaime Marquet (1710–1782)
- Cèsar Martinell i Brunet
- Enric Miralles (1955–2000)
- Rafael Moneo (born 1937)
- Adolfo Moran (born 1953)
- Luis Moreno Mansilla (1959–2012)
- Berenguer de Montagut
- Carlos Morales Quintana

== N–Z ==
- Enrique Nieto
- Justo Antonio de Olaguibel
- Alberto Palacio (1856–1939)
- Antonio Palacios (1874–1945)
- Liliana Palaia Pérez (born 1951)
- José Luis Picardo (1919–2010)
- Carme Pinós (born 1954)
- Isidre Puig Boada (1891–1987)
- Josep Puig i Cadafalch
- Salvador Valeri i Pupurull
- Diego de Riaño (16th century)
- Pedro de Ribera (18th century)
- Ventura Rodríguez
- Maria Rubert de Ventós (born 1956)
- Francisco Javier Sáenz de Oiza (1918–2000)
- Enric Sagnier (1858–1931)
- Josep Lluís Sert (1902–1983)
- Diego Siloe (1495–11563)
- Alejandro de la Sota (1913–1996)
- Luis Gutiérrez Soto (1890–1977)
- Tioda (9th century)
- Juan Bautista de Toledo
- Manuel Tolsá (1757–1816)
- Narciso Tomé (1690–1742)
- Eduardo Torroja
- Emilio Tuñón
- Òscar Tusquets
- Andrés de Vandelvira
- Lorenzo Vázquez de Segovia
- Luis de Vega
- Luis Vidal
- Juan Bautista Villalpando
- Juan de Villanueva
- Alejandro Zaera (born 1963)
- Secundino Zuazo (1887–1971)

== See also ==
- Architecture of Spain
- List of architects
- List of Spaniards
