= Guillermo Vázquez Consuegra =

Spanish architect

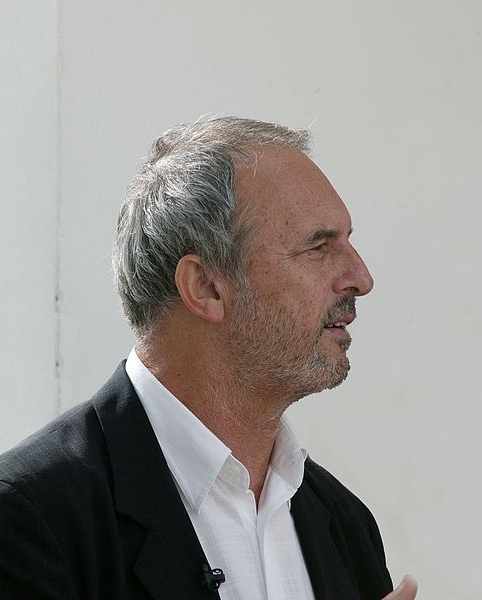
- Consuegra in February 2017
- Born: 30 September 1945 (age 80); Sevilla, Spain
- Education: Higher Technical School of Architecture of Seville (1972)
- Occupation: Architect
- Awards: 2A Continental Architectural Awards (2018); CSCAE Gold Medal (2016); Honorary Member of the American Institute of Architects (AIA) (2014); Grand Prize of the Buenos Aires International Biennial (2011); Ugo Rivolta European Architecture Prize (2008); Andalusia Architecture Prize (2007); Spanish Architecture Award (2005)
- Practice: Vázquez Consuegra Architects
- Projects: Navigation Pavilion (Seville); Valencian Museum of Illustration and Modernity; National Museum of Subaquatic Archaeology; FIBES Conference and Exhibition Centre
- Website: www.vazquezconsuegra.com

Guillermo Vázquez Consuegra is a Spanish architect.

== Biography ==
Consuegra graduated from the Higher Technical School of Architecture of Seville (ETSA) in 1972. He obtained a job as a professor of design at this university until 1987, where he is currently an honorary professor and director of the Cátedra Blanca international architecture workshop. He has been a visiting professor at the Universities of Buenos Aires, Lausanne, Navarra, Syracuse (New York), Bologna, Venice, and Mendrisio, and a visiting scholar at the Getty Center in Los Angeles. Throughout these years, he has combined his work as a professor with his professional practice.

He has taken part in multiple exhibitions, notably the Venice Biennale in 1980 and 2004, the Milan Triennale in 1988, the Georges Pompidou Centre in Paris in 1990, the Art Institute of Chicago in 1992, and the New York Museum of Modern Art in 2006.

Among his main achievements are the social housing buildings in Seville, Rota and Madrid, the Navigation Pavilion Expo '92 Seville, the Vigo Maritime Edge Development, the Museum of Illustration in Valencia, the Sea Museum in Genoa, the Tomares Town Hall, the National Museum of Underwater Archaeology in Cartagena, the restoration of the San Telmo Palace, the Seville Conference Center and the Caixaforum Seville Cultural Center.

He is preparing, among others, the rehabilitation of the Archaeological Museum of Seville, the Atarazanas Cultural Center of Seville and the Ministry of Foreign Affairs of Luxembourg.

Among his awards are the Construmat Prize 1993, the ASCER Prize 2006, the Ugo Rivolta European Architecture Prize 2008, the Ibero-American Biennial Prize 2014, and the Chicago Athenaeum Museum International Architecture Prize 2015 and The Plan Award 2015. His professional career has been recognized with the Arpafil Prize (Guadalajara International Book Fair, Mexico) 2006, the Andalusia Architecture Prize 2007, and the Grand Prize of the Buenos Aires International Biennial 2011. He is an Honorary Member of the American Institute of Architects (AIA) since 2014 and was recently awarded the gold medal for Spanish Architecture 2016.

== Notable works ==
- 1987, Ramón y Cajal Social Housing Building, Seville
- 1988, Telecommunications Tower (Tavira Tower II) and telephone services building, Cádiz
- 1991, Navigation Pavilion for the 1992 Seville Universal Exposition
- 2001, MUVIM, Valencian Museum of Illustration and Modernity in Valencia
- 2004, Planning of the Vigo Seafront (Promenade, Ría Station, Plaza del Berbés, Plaza de Estrella, Elduayen Gardens, Beiramar Tunnel and Areal Fountain), Vigo
- 2004, Rehabilitation of the Santa Ana Estate as the headquarters of the Tomares Town Hall, Seville.
- 2004, Social Housing in Rota, Cadiz
- 2004, Galata, Museum of the Sea and Navigation, Genoa, Italy
- 2007, Visitor Centre of the Archaeological Ensemble of Baelo Claudia, Ensenada de Bolonia, Tarifa, Cádiz
- 2008, National Museum of Underwater Archaeology, Cartagena
- 2010, Restoration of the Palacio de San Telmo to serve as the headquarters of the Presidency of the Junta de Andalucía, Seville
- 2012, Palacio de Congresos de Sevilla
- 2012, Social Housing in Vallecas, Madrid
- 2014, Market and Civic Hall in Torrent, Valencia
- 2017, Caixaforum Cultural Centre Seville
- 2017, Ministry of Foreign Affairs of Luxembourg

=== Other works ===
- 1975, Garden, Olivares, Seville
- 1976, Casa Elizalde, Mairena del Aljarafe, Spain
- 1980, House and studio for the painter Rolando Campos, Mairena del Aljarafe, Seville
- 1983, Casa Uhtna-Hus, Mairena del Aljarafe, Spain
- 1984, Social housing building on Ramón y Cajal street, Seville, Spain
- 1985, Andalusian Institute of Culture, Patio de Banderas 14, Seville, Spain
- 1986, Social housing buildings in Barriada de la Paz, Cádiz, Spain
- 1986, Automatic exchange for Telefónica in the Pinomontano neighborhood, Seville, Spain
- 1992, Social housing buildings, Almendralejo, Spain
- 1995, Rehabilitation of the old Cartuja factory, for the headquarters of the Andalusian Institute of Historical Heritage, Seville, Spain
- 1987, Social housing buildings on Sierra Elvira and M-30 streets, Madrid, Spain
- 1993, Casa Olavarría in Valencina de la Concepción, Seville, Spain
- 2000, Rehabilitation of the Villalón House for a House of Culture, Morón de la Frontera, Spain
- 2000, Rehabilitation of the Santa Ana Estate for the headquarters of the Tomares Town Hall, Spain
- 2005, Regional Archive of Castilla-La Mancha, Toledo, Spain
- 2004, Social housing in Rota, Spain
- 2007, Palace of Justice of Ciudad Real, Spain
- 2007, Visitor Centre of the Archaeological Ensemble of Baelo-Claudia de Bolonia, Tarifa, Spain
- 2009, Robinson House in Zahara de los Atunes, Cadiz
- 2011, Social housing buildings in Vallecas, Madrid, Spain
- 2019, Otto Engelhardt Fashion Show

== Awards ==
- 1988, COAAO Architecture Prize (Social housing building on Ramón y Cajal street in Seville)
- 1989, National Construmat Award (Social housing building on Ramón y Cajal street in Seville)
- 1991, COAAO Architecture Prize (Social housing buildings in Barriada de la Paz in Cádiz)
- 1992, COAAO Architecture Prize (Navigation Pavilion Expo'92 Seville)
- 1993, Construmat Award, Building Mention (Navigation Pavilion Expo'92 in Seville)
- 1994, Architecti Award - Belem Cultural Center (Planning of the Vigo Waterfront)
- 1994, Award II Spanish Biennial of Architecture and Urbanism for Navigation Pavilion at Expo'92 in Seville
- 1998, Urban Planning and Architecture Award from the Council of Vigo (Organisation of the Maritime Edge of Vigo)
- 2001, National Award CEOE Foundation (Valencian Museum of Illustration and Modernity)
- 2003, Prize "Il Principe e l'Architetto", Ministero per i Beni e le Attività Culturali, Italy (Museo del Mare e della Navigazione de Genoa)
- 2004, Award to the Museo Rivelazione dell Anno (Museum Image)(Museo del Mare de Genova)
- 2005, Award for the best Intervention in Public Spaces from COAG (Planning of the Maritime Edge of Vigo)
- 2005, Spanish National Architecture Award (Planning of the Vigo Maritime Edge)
- 2006, IVE Award for professional career. Valencian Institute of Building, Valencian Government
- 2007, Andalusia Architecture Prize in its first edition
- 2008, Ugo Rivolta European Award for the social housing building in Rota (Cadiz)
- 2009, Murcia Region Building Award to the National Museum of Underwater Archaeology in Cartagena
- 2010, International Trophée Archzinc Award in the Public Building category to the National Museum of Underwater Archaeology Paris
- 2010, Aster Award for professional career. School of Marketing and Business, ESIC
- 2011, Grand Prize Biennial. XIII Buenos Aires International Architecture Biennial
- 2011, NAN Architecture and Construction Award to the San Telmo Palace
- 2013, Palmarés Architecture Aluminium Technal Award to the Seville Conference Centre
- 2014, Honorary Member of the American Institute of Architects (AIA), Chicago
- 2014, First Prize of the IX Ibero-American Biennial of Architecture and Urbanism for Social Housing in Vallecas. Rosario, Argentina
- 2014, NAN Architecture and Construction Award for Social Housing in Vallecas
- 2015, Best Architects 16 International Architecture Award for Social Housing in Vallecas. Düsseldorf
- 2015, The Plan International Architecture Award in the “Public Space” category for the Hospital Gardens in Valencia. Milan
- 2015, The Plan Award International Architecture Prize in the “Housing” category for Social Housing in Vallecas. Milan
- 2015, International Architecture Award The Chicago Athenaeum Museum. USA for Social Housing in Vallecas. Chicago
- 2015, International Architecture Award The Chicago Athenaeum Museum. USA to the Seville Conference Center. Chicago
- 2015, Architects' Association Award. COAS to the San Telmo Palace . Seville
- 2016, NAN Architecture and Construction Award for the Market and Civic Hall in Torrent
- 2016, Gold Medal for Architecture. Higher Council of Colleges of Architects of Spain
- 2018, ArchDaily Building of the year Award 2018 to the CaixaForum Seville Cultural Center. New York

== Monographic publications ==
- 1983, Vázquez Consuegra. Works and Projects 1973–1983. College of Architects of Madrid
- 1986, Vázquez Consuegra. Architect. College of Architects of Malaga
- 1992, Vázquez Consuegra. Introduction by Peter Buchanan. Editorial Gustavo Gili
- 1992, Vázquez Consuegra. Four social housing projects. Introduction by Luis Fernández Galiano. Almería College of Architects
- 2000, Vázquez Consuegra. Planning of the Vigo Maritime Edge . Ministry of Public Works. Madrid
- 2001, Vázquez Consuegra. College of Architects of Valencia and Provincial Council of Valencia
- 2001, MUVIM . Museum of Illustration . Introduction by Carlos Meri. TC Notebooks. Valencia
- 2002, Vázquez Consuegra. Introduction Francesco Gulinello. Facoltà di Architettura di Bologna. Italy. Second expanded edition 2007
- 2005, Vázquez Consuegra. Saggio di V. Pérez Escolano. Documenti di Architettura. Electa Editorial
- 2005, Vázquez Consuegra. The Invisible Footprint. Screenplay and direction by Gemma de Andrés for Spanish Television
- 2007, Vázquez Consuegra. Trentotto domande. Saper Credere In Architettura. To cure di T.Vecci. Clean Editions. Naples
- 2007, Tomares Town Hall . Rehabilitation of the Santa Ana Estate. Regional Government of Andalusia
- 2008, Vázquez Consuegra. Vigo Waterfront . Gustavo Gili Publishing House. Barcelona
- 2008, Vázquez Consuegra. Saggio di Luca Lanini and Manuela Raitano. Edilstampa Publishing House. Rome
- 2008, “Guillermo Vázquez Consuegra” First Andalusia Architecture Prize. Regional Government of Andalusia
- 2009, Vázquez Consuegra. Saggio di V. Pérez Escolano. Documenti di Architettura. Electa Editorial. Revised and expanded Second Edition
- 2010, “Vázquez Consuegra. Architecture 1998-2010”. TC Cuadernos Publishing House. Valencia
- 2010, “The San Telmo Palace Restored”. Regional Government of Andalusia. Seville
- 2009, "Architectures of the Author" . Published by the University of Navarra . Pamplona
- 2013, "Vázquez Consuegra. Palace of San Telmo". Introduction by William JR Curtis. Edited by Labirinto de Paixóns. La Coruna
- 2014, "Guillermo Vázquez Consuegra. Seville Conference Centre". Texts by JM Hernández León, Fredy Massad, David Cohn and Ignacio de la Peña. La Fábrica Publishing House. Madrid
- 2016, "Guillermo Vázquez Consuegra. Projects+Contests". Introduction by Joâo Luís Carrilho da Graça. Uzina Books Publishing House. Lisbon
- 2017, "CaixaForum Sevilla". Conarquitectura Publishing House. Madrid
- 2017, "Cultural Center in Seville: Guillermo Vázquez Consuegra". Introduction by Ignacio de la Peña. Conarquitectura Publishing House. Madrid
