= Spanish Architecture Award =

Architecture prize

- Awarded for: Outstanding finished architectural work
- Sponsored by: Consejo Superior de los Colegios de Arquitectos de España
- Country: Spain
- First award: 1993
- Website: www.cscae.com/index.php/es/conoce-cscae/area-cultural/premio-de-arquitectura-espanola

The Spanish Architecture Award (Spanish: Premio de Arquitectura Española) is a prize which has been given biennially by the Consejo Superior de los Colegios de Arquitectos de España (CSCAE) since 1993.

It was created to publicize the quality of architectural works in Spain. It is granted to the finished work that is considered worthy of recognition for its architectural singularity, its innovative contribution, and its paradigmatic construction quality. The winner is chosen by a jury comprising the head of the CSCAE, government ministers, and prominent architects.

== Winning works ==
Year	Work	Architect(s)	Image	Ref
1993	Sevilla Santa Justa train station	Antonio Cruz Villalón and Antonio Ortiz García		
1995	Mare de Déu de Villvana-Morella Public School	Enric Miralles and Carme Pinós		
1997	A Coruña Museum of Fine Arts	Jose Manuel Gallego Jorreto		
1999	A Coruña University Center of Health Sciences	Manuel de las Casas		
1999	Córdoba Bus Station	César Portela		
2001	Palau de Congressos de Catalunya	Carlos Ferrater Lambarri and José María Cartaña Gubern		
2003	León City Auditorium	Emilio Tuñón and Luis Moreno Mansilla		
2005	Restoration of the Maritime Border of Vigo	Guillermo Vázquez Consuegra		
2007	Teatro Valle-Inclán in Lavapiés, Madrid	Ángela García de Paredes and Ignacio García Pedrosa		
2009	Spanish Pavilion at the 2008 Zaragoza International Expo	Francisco Mangado		
2011	Maritime Promenade of Poniente Beach in Benidorm	Carlos Ferrater Lambarri and Xavier Martí i Gal		
2013	Preschool in Pamplona (ex-aequo)	Carlos Pereda Iglesias and Oscar Pérez Silanes		
2013	Cartuja Hospital, Cartuja Institute of Advanced Techniques in Medicine of Seville (ex-aequo)	José Morales Sánchez and Sara de Giles Dubois MGM arquitectos		
2015	Restoration of the old Military Hospital for the Granada Higher Technical School of Architecture	Víctor López Cotelo		
2017	Royal Collections Museum	Emilio Tuñón and Luis Moreno Mansilla		
2017	Palma de Mallorca Palacio de Congresos and Hotel	Francisco Mangado		
