= Rita Fernández =

Rita Fernández may refer to:

- Rita Fernández Padilla (born 1946), Colombian singer and songwriter
- Rita Fernández Queimadelos (1911–2008), Spanish architect
