= Mansilla + Tuñón Architects =

Spanish architectural firm

Practice information
- Key architects: Luis M. Mansilla; Emilio Tuñon Álvarez
- Founded: 1992
- Location: Madrid, Spain

Significant works and honors
- Buildings: MUSAC; Auditorio Ciudad de León; Museo Provincial de Zamora
- Projects: Royal Collections Museum, Madrid
- Awards: European Union Prize for Contemporary Architecture (Mies van der Rohe Award) (2007); Premio de Arquitectura Española (Spanish Architecture Prize) (2003)

Mansilla + Tuñón Architects is a Spanish architecture firm founded in Madrid in 1992 by Luis Moreno Mansilla (Madrid, 1959–2012) and Emilio Tuñón (Madrid, 1958). In 2014, Mansilla + Tuñón Architects received Spain’s Gold Medal of Merit in the Fine Arts.

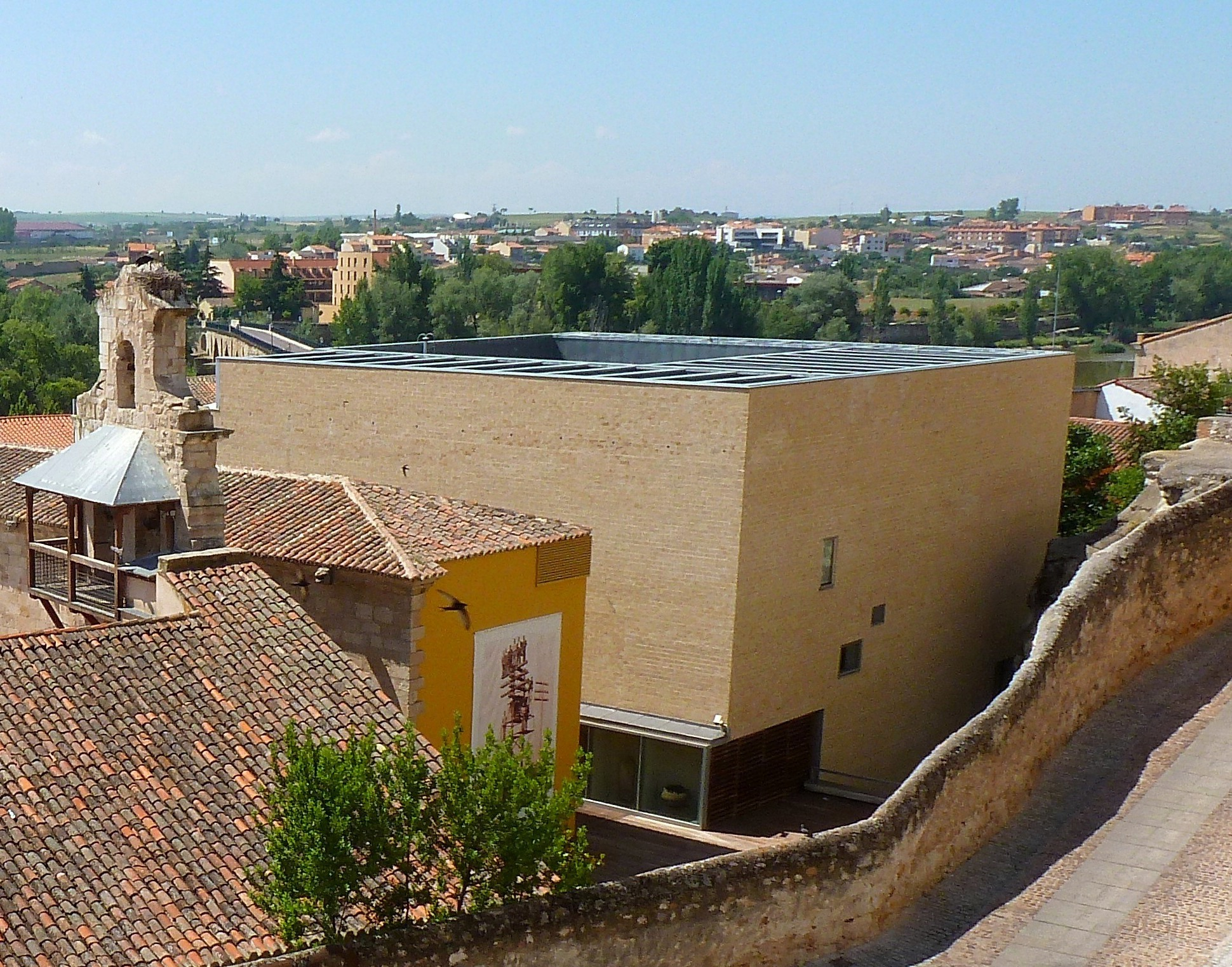
Museum of Zamora, Spain

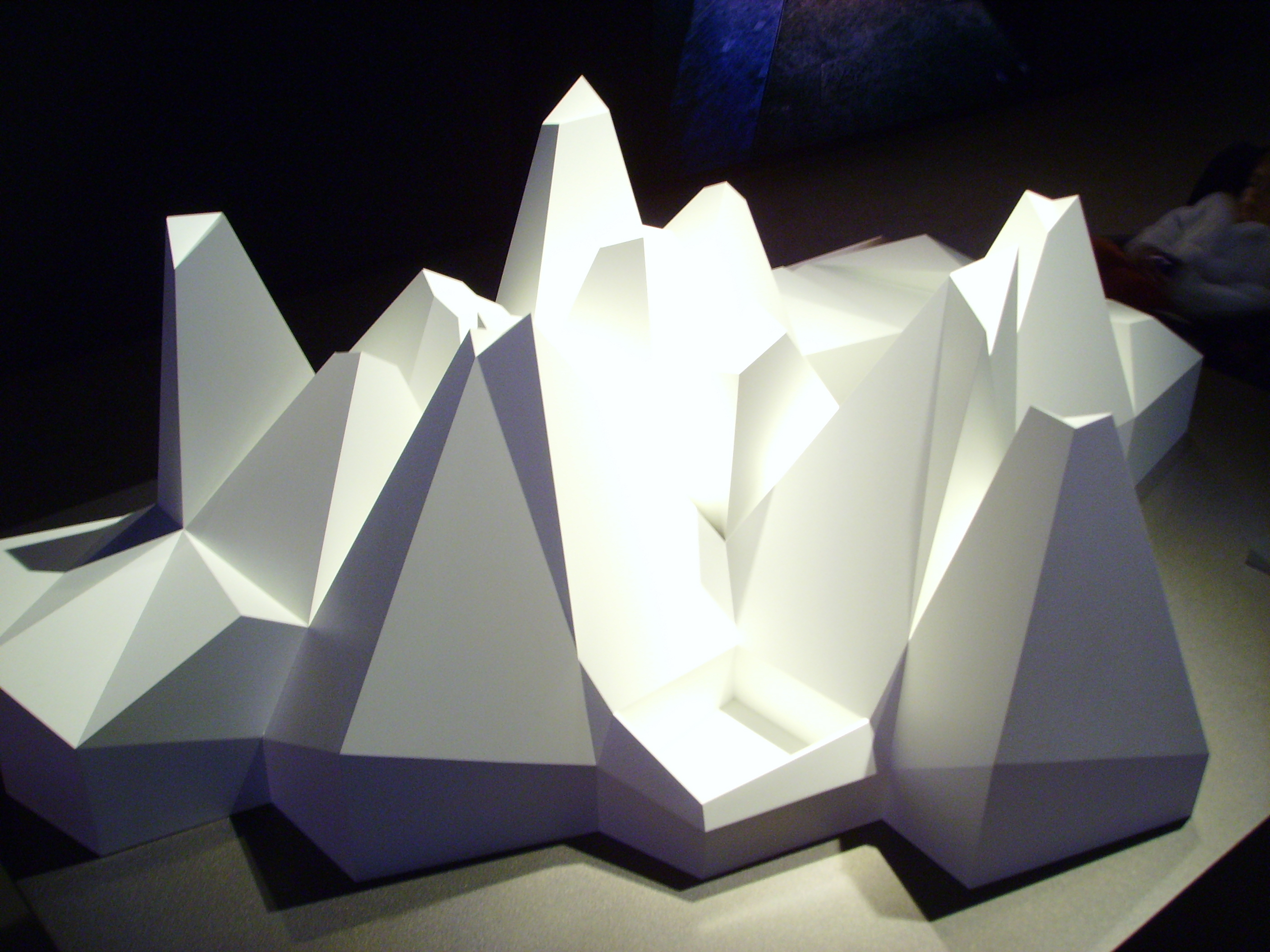
Museum of Cantabria Project.

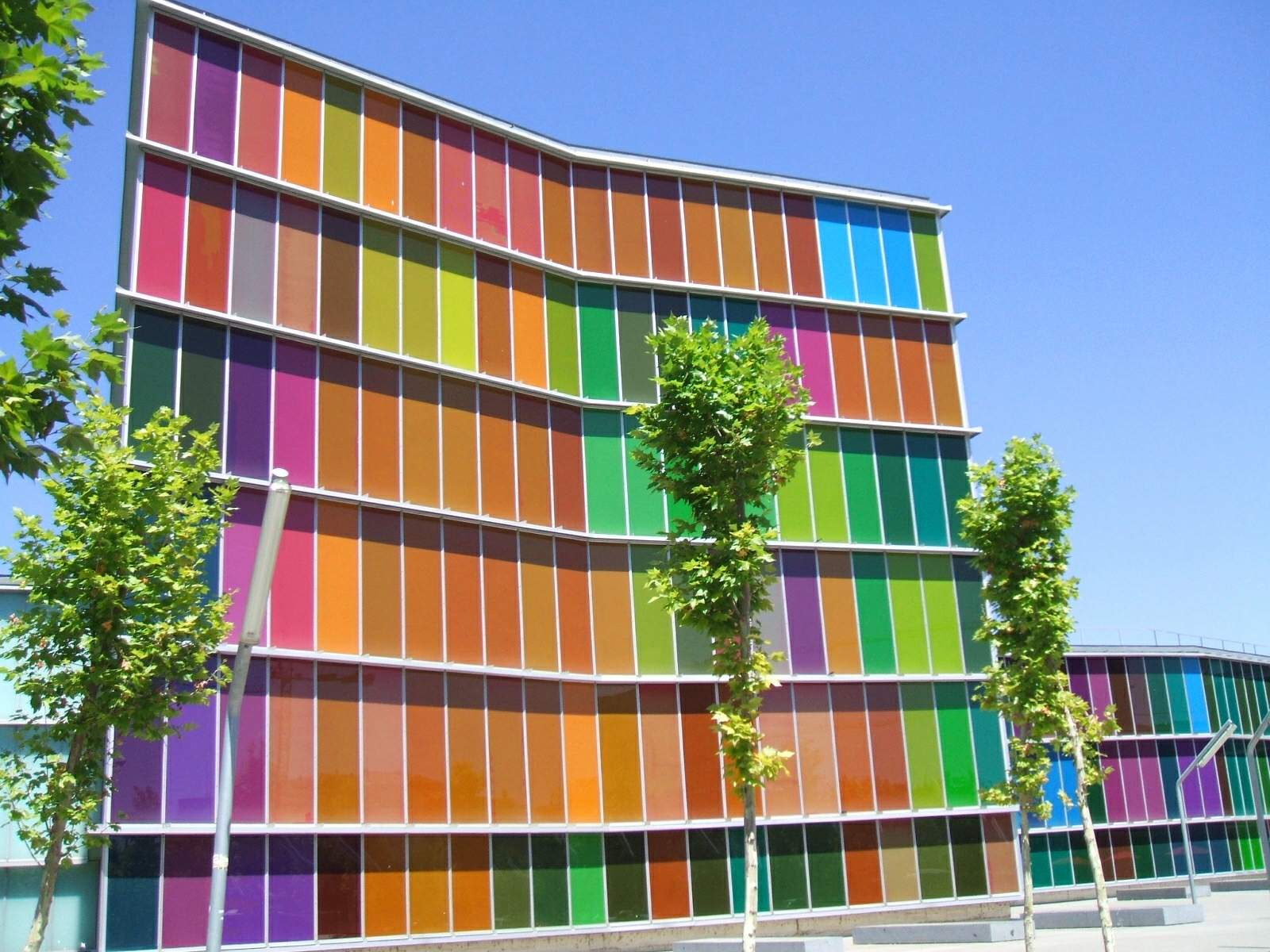
Aerial view of MUSAC

Their MUSAC building in León won the 2007 European Union Prize for Contemporary Architecture – Mies van der Rohe Award. They have also won the public competitions to build the C.I.C.C.M. New Convention Palace in Madrid (2007), as well as the Museo de las Colecciones Reales (Spanish Royal Collections Museum), also in Madrid.The firm also designed Madrid’s Royal Collections Gallery, a project completed in 2015 and located beside the Royal Palace and Almudena Cathedral.

They are teachers at the ETSAM school in Madrid and have taught at the Graduate School of Design in Harvard University, the EPFL in Lausanne, the Nueva Escuela de Arquitectura in Puerto Rico, the Städelschule in Frankfurt am Main, and currently at the School of Architecture at Princeton University.

Their works has been widely published and exhibited in some of the most prestigious magazines, book editions and museums in the world. In 2009 they directed the Biennial X of Spanish Architecture.

== Notable works ==
- Relais & Châteaux Atrio in Cáceres, Spain (2010)
- Helga de Alvear Foundation – Visual Arts Center in Cáceres, Spain (2010)
- Lalín Town Hall, Spain (2010)
- Twin Houses in Tarifa, Spain (2009)
- Pedro Barrié de la Maza Foundation in Vigo, Spain (2005)
- Castilla y León Museum of Contemporary Art (MUSAC) in León, Spain (2004)
- Joaquín Leguina Regional Library and Madrid Regional Archives rehabilitation of the former El Águila brewery in Madrid, Spain (2002)
- Ciudad de León Auditorium in León, Spain (2002)
- Fine Arts Museum of Castellón, Spain (2000)
- San Fernando de Henares Swimming Center in Madrid, Spain (1998)
- Regional Museum of Zamora, Spain (1996)

== Competition success ==
- Vega Baja Museum in Toledo: Toletum Visigodo, Spain (2010)
- Energy Dome in the Environmental City of Soria, Spain (2008)
- Museum of Automotion in Madrid, Spain (2008)
- Museum of Migrations in Algeciras, Spain (2007)
- International Convention Center of the City of Madrid, Spain (2007)
- Helga de Alvear Foundation - Arts Center in Cáceres, Spain (2005)
- Lalín Town Hall, Spain (2004)
- Public Library in Artistas street in Madrid, Spain (2003)
- Masterplan of Valbuena in Logroño, Spain (2003)
- Museum of Cantabria, Spain (2002)
- Royal Collections Museum in Madrid, Spain (2002)
- Museum of Sanfermines, Spain (2001)
- Contemporary Culture Center in Brescia, Italy (2000)
- Fine Arts Museum of Castellón, Spain (1997)
- Ciudad de León Auditorium, Spain (1996)
- Arts and Culture Regional Center of Madrid in the former El Águila brewery (1995)

== Recognition and awards ==
- Gold Medal of Merit in the Fine Arts (Spain) (2014)
- Big Mat award (2013)
- FAD award (2011)
- A plus award (2011)
- European Union Prize for Contemporary Architecture (Mies van der Rohe Award) (2007) (for the MUSAC)
- FAD award (2007)
- VIA award (2006)
- Enor award (2005)
- Spanish Architecture Prize (2003)
- COAM award (2003)
- FAD award (2001)
- COACV award (2000)
- Excellent Work award (2000)
- CEOE Foundation award (1997)
- Architecti award (1996)

== Selected publications ==
- Mansilla + Tuñón arquitectos 1992–2012, "El Croquis", nº 161, San Lorenzo de El Escorial, Madrid, 2012
- Antonello Marotta, Mansilla + Tuñón, Edilstampa, Roma, Italia, 2012
- Concello de Lalín, o Castro Tecnolóxico. Ed. Concello de Lalín. Pontevedra, España, 2011
- Mansilla + Tuñón 1992–2011. AV Monografías nº144, Madrid, España, 2010
- Mansilla + Tuñón arquitectos, in "El Croquis", nº 149, (I), San Lorenzo de El Escorial, Madrid, 2010
- Mansilla + Tuñón arquitectos, in "El Croquis", nº 136–137, (III-IV), San Lorenzo de El Escorial, Madrid, 2007
- Patricia Molins. Mansilla + Tuñón dal 1992. Ed. Electa, Milan, Italia, 2007
- Luis Mansilla, Luis Rojo y Emilio Tuñón. Escritos Circenses. Ed. Gustavo Gili, Barcelona, España, 2005
- Mansilla + Tuñón, Obra reciente, in "2G", nº 27, Ed. Gustavo Gili, Barcelona, España, 2003

== Gallery ==
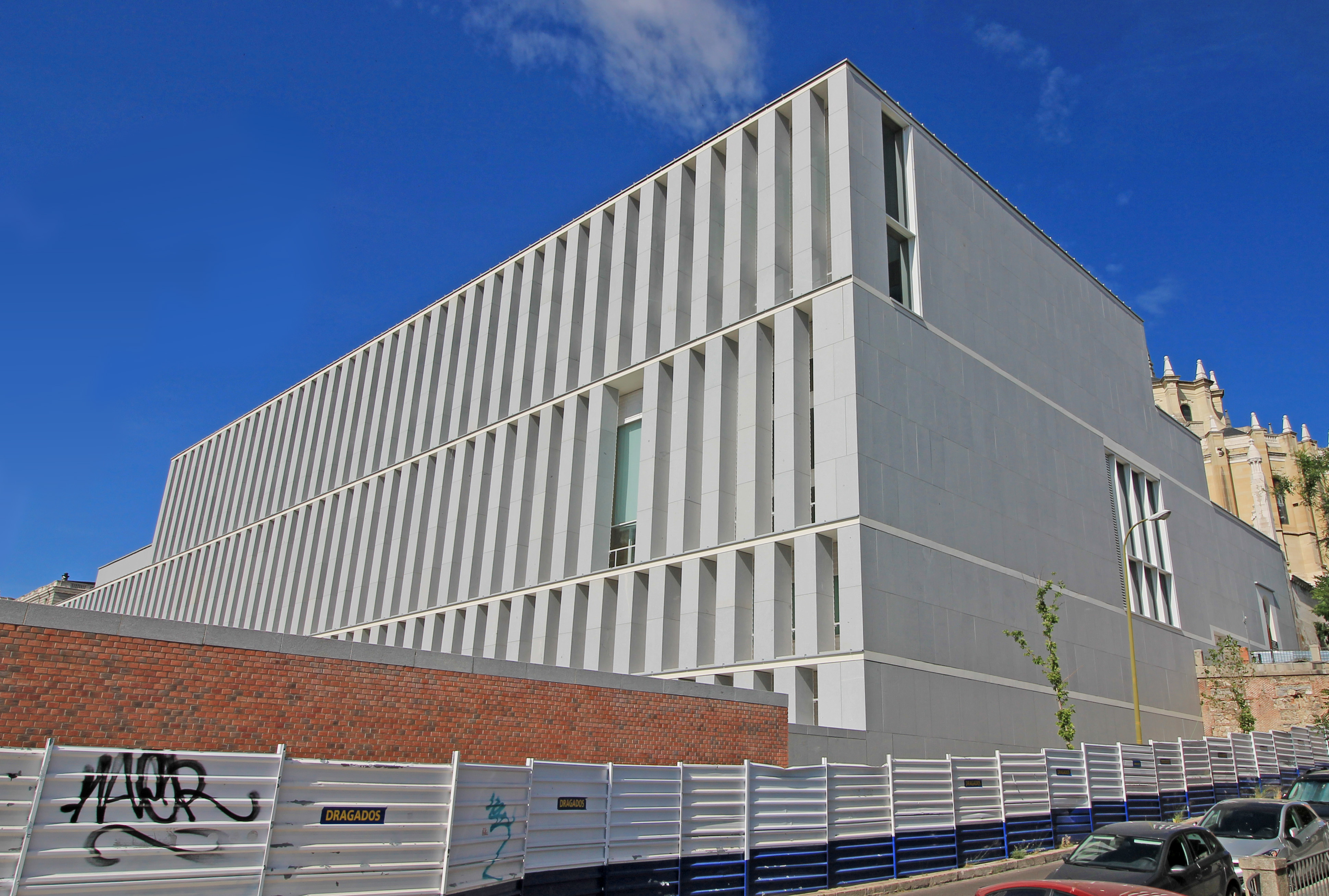
Royal Collections Museum in Madrid

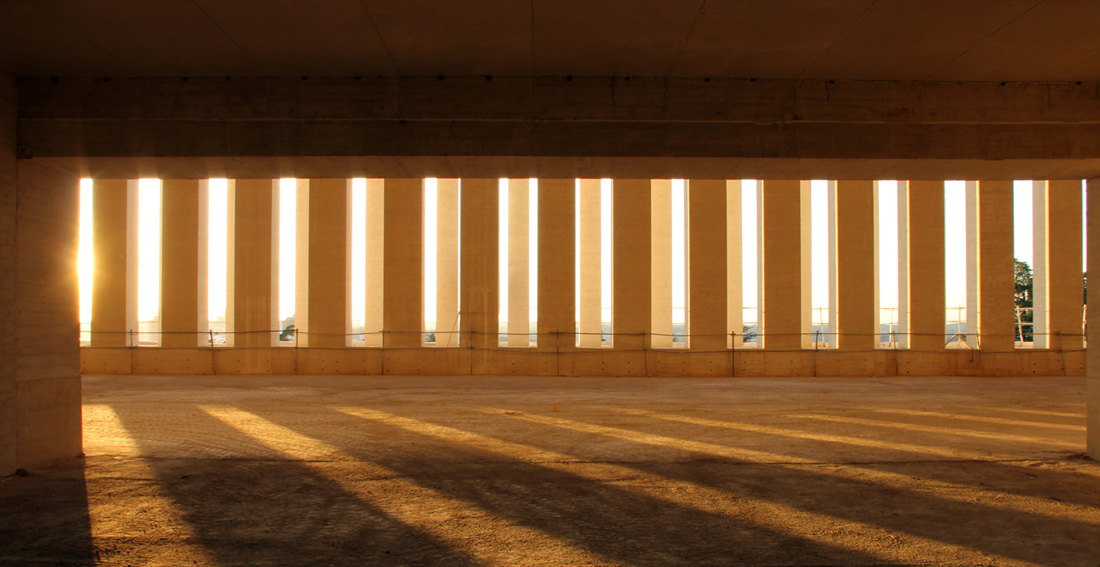
Royal Collections Museum
Mansilla + Tuñón
Madrid, Spain

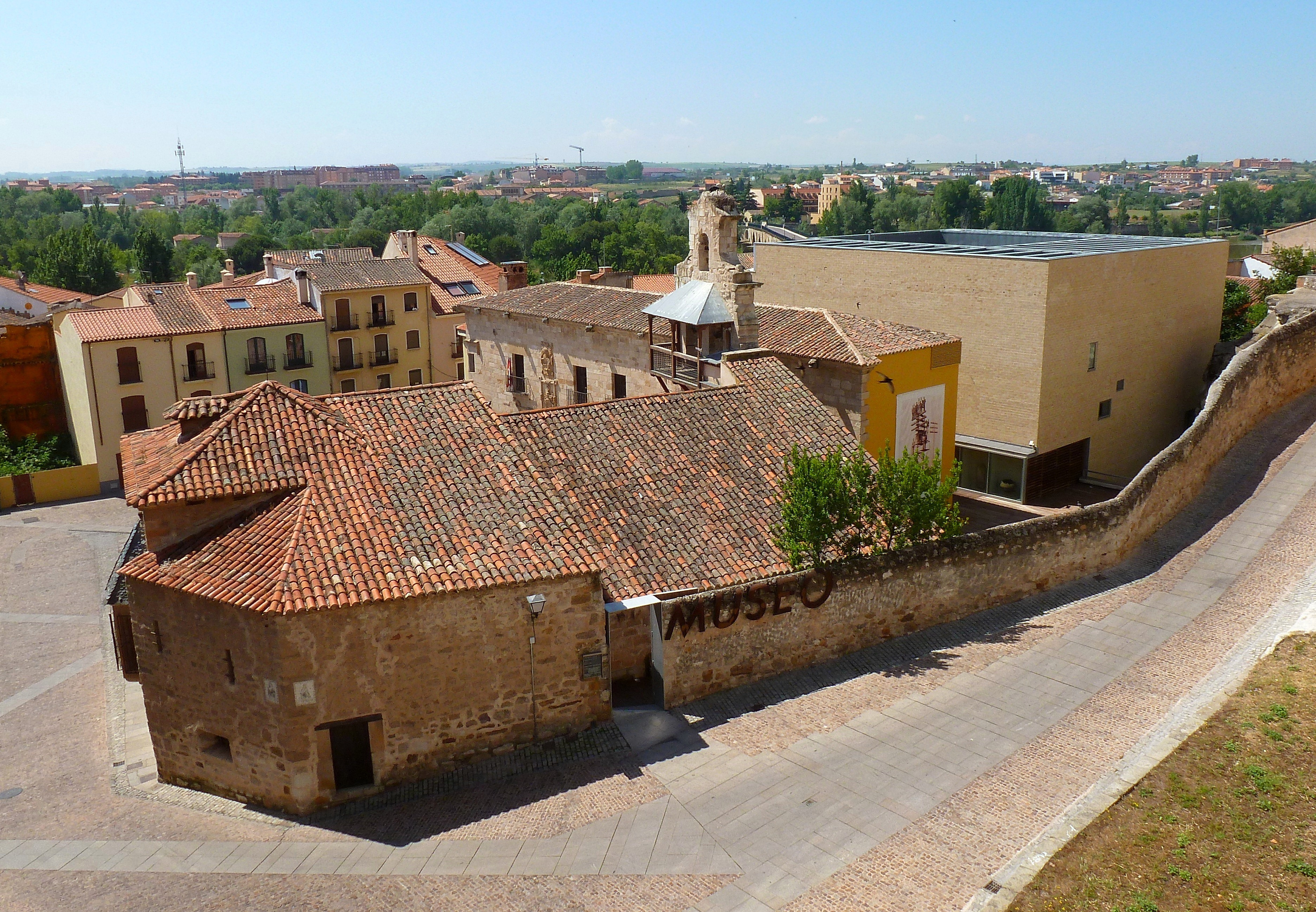
Regional Museum of Zamora
Mansilla + Tuñón
Zamora, Spain

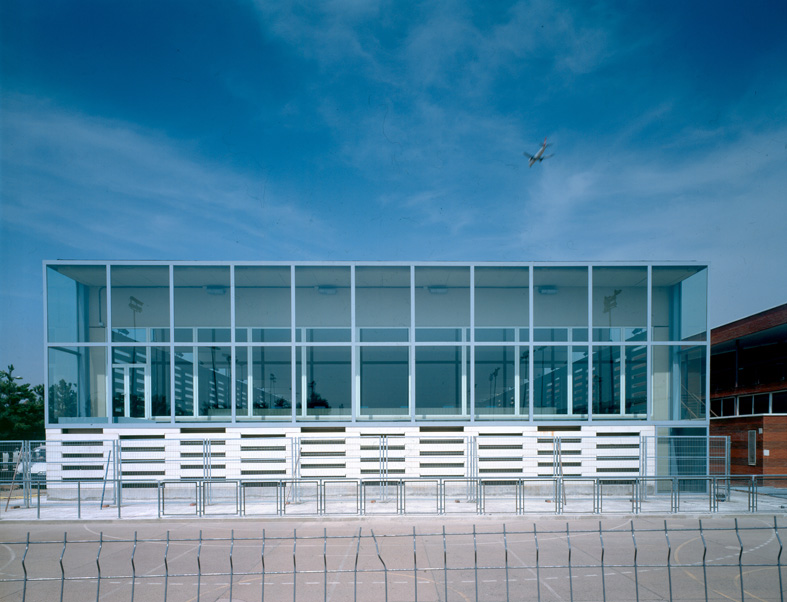
San Fernando de Henares Indoor Swimming-pool
Mansilla + Tuñón
Madrid, Spain

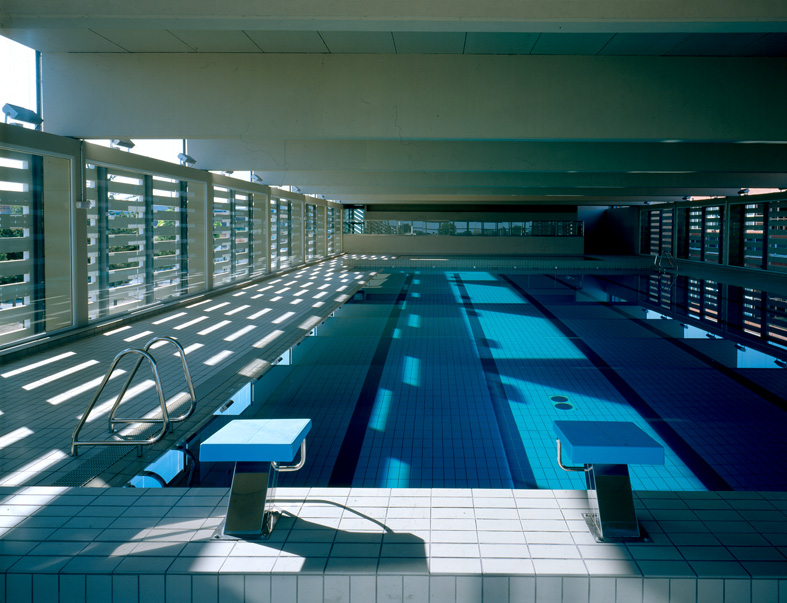
San Fernando de Henares Indoor Swimming-pool
Mansilla + Tuñón
Madrid, Spain

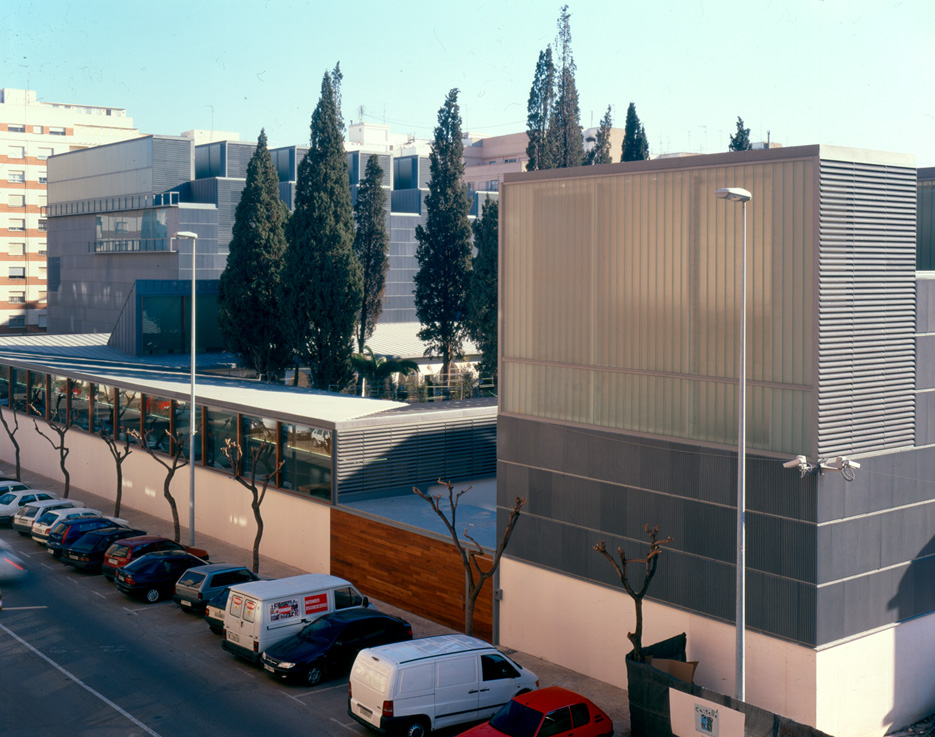
Fine Arts Museum of Castellón
Mansilla + Tuñón
Castellón, Spain

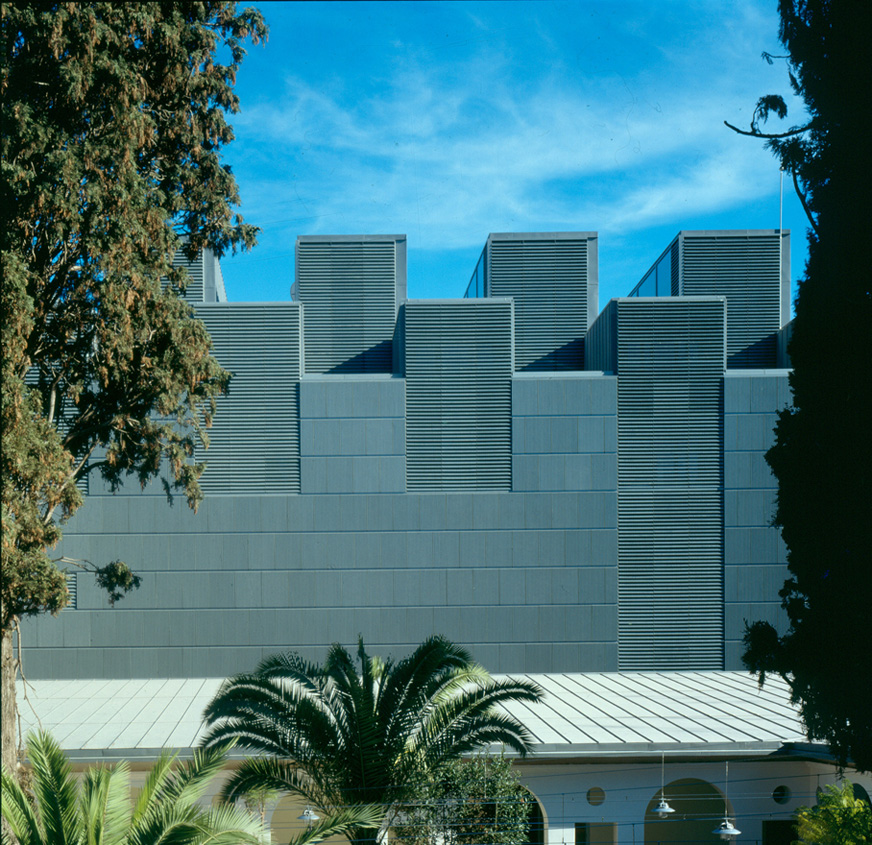
Fine Arts Museum of Castellón
Mansilla + Tuñón
Castellón, Spain

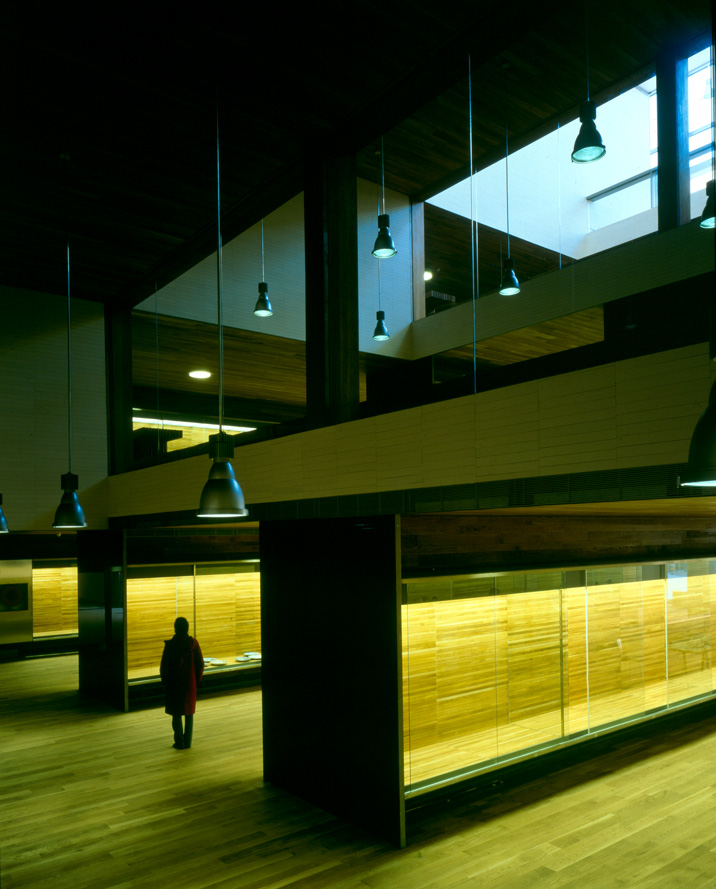
Fine Arts Museum of Castellón
Mansilla + Tuñón
Castellón, Spain

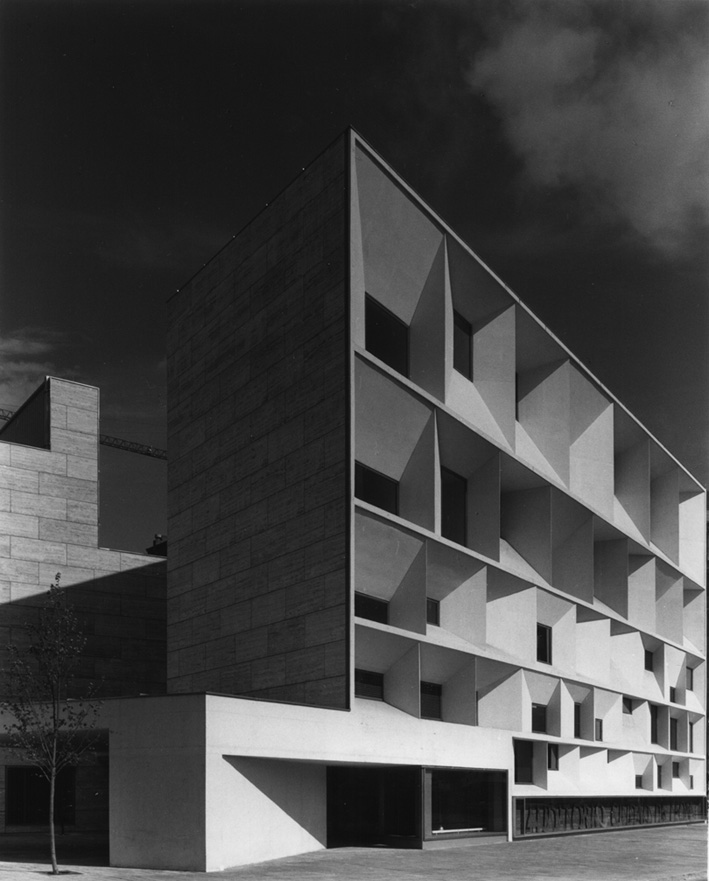
Ciudad de León Auditorium
Mansilla + Tuñón
León, Spain

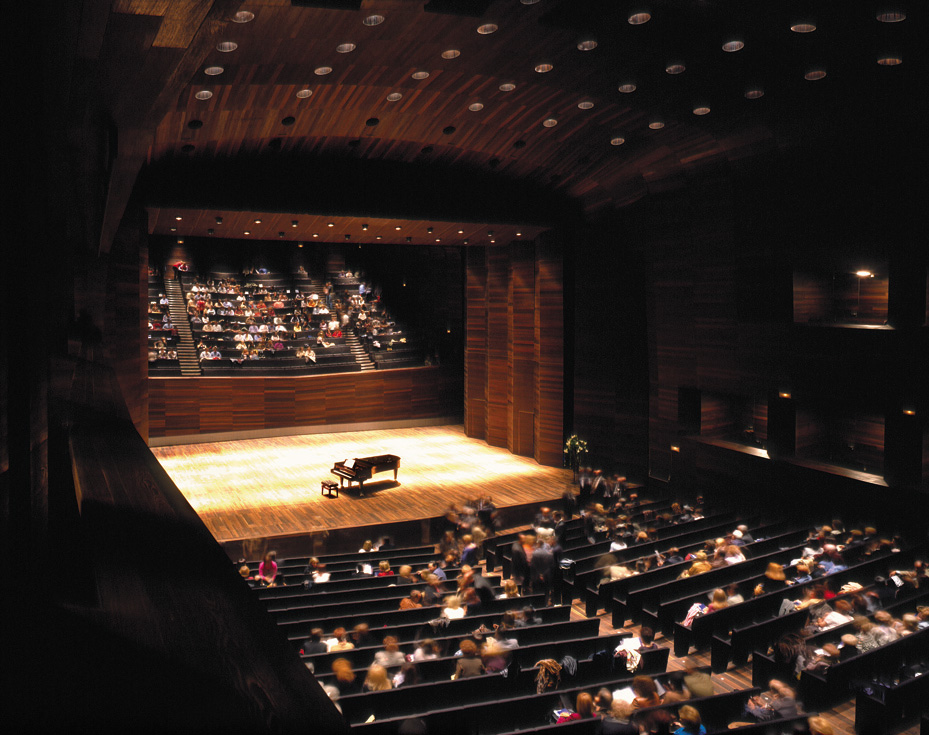
Ciudad de León Auditorium
Mansilla + Tuñón
León, Spain

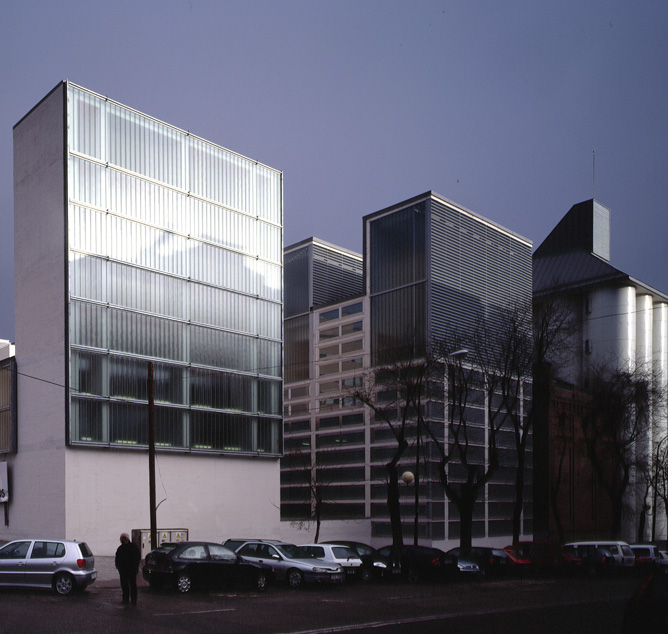
Joaquín Leguina Madrid Regional Library and Archives in the former El Águila Brewery
Mansilla + Tuñón
Madrid, Spain

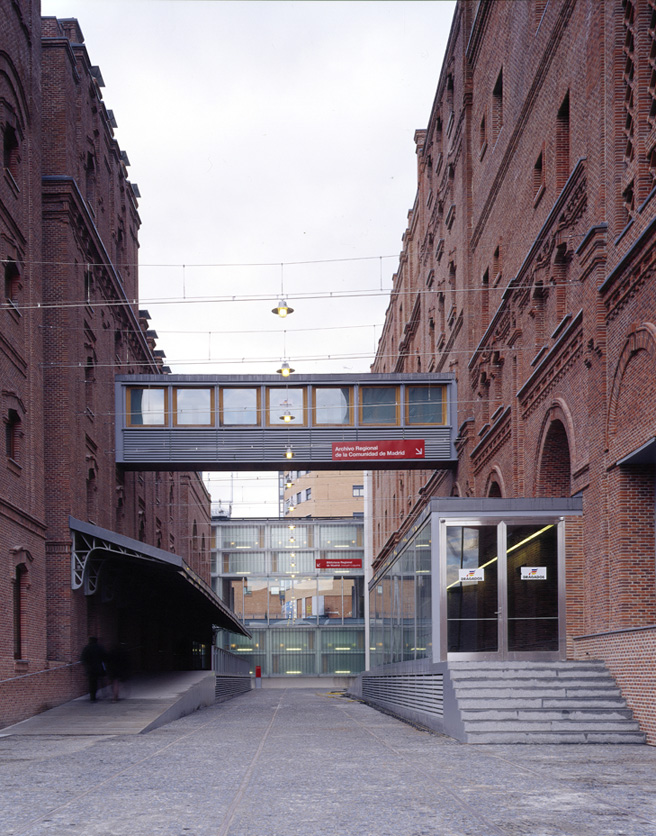
Joaquín Leguina Madrid Regional Library and Archives in the former El Águila Brewery
Mansilla + Tuñón
Madrid, Spain

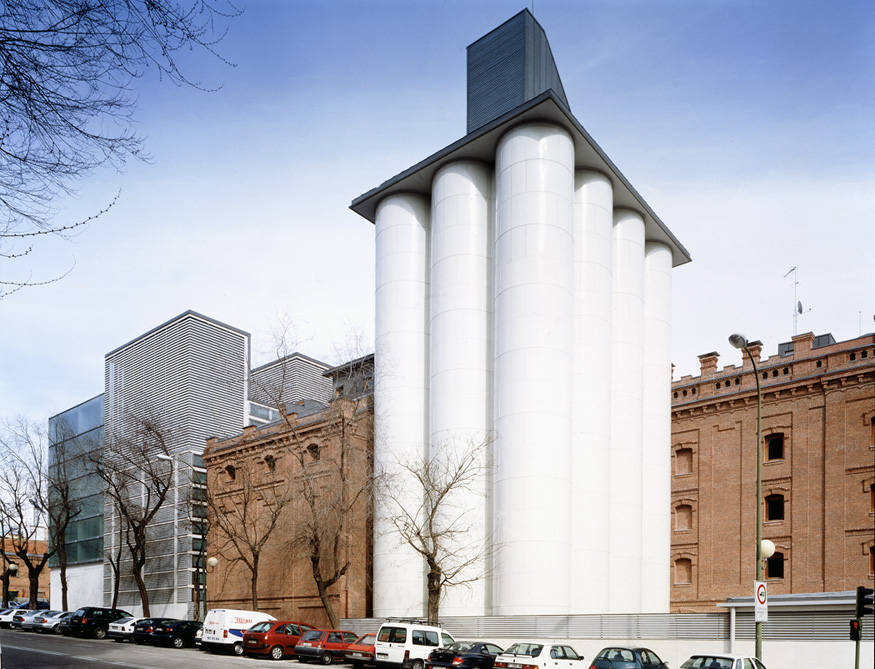
Joaquín Leguina Madrid Regional Library and Archives in the former El Águila Brewery
Mansilla + Tuñón
Madrid, Spain

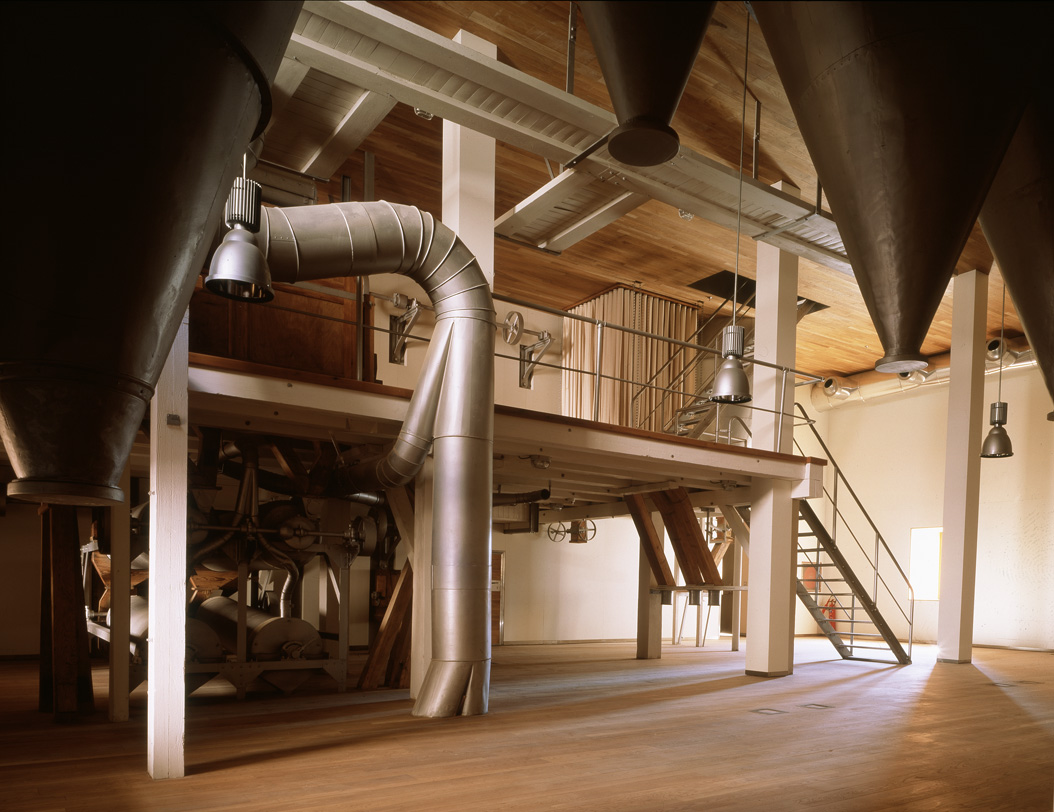
Joaquín Leguina Madrid Regional Library and Archives in the former El Águila Brewery
Mansilla + Tuñón
Madrid, Spain

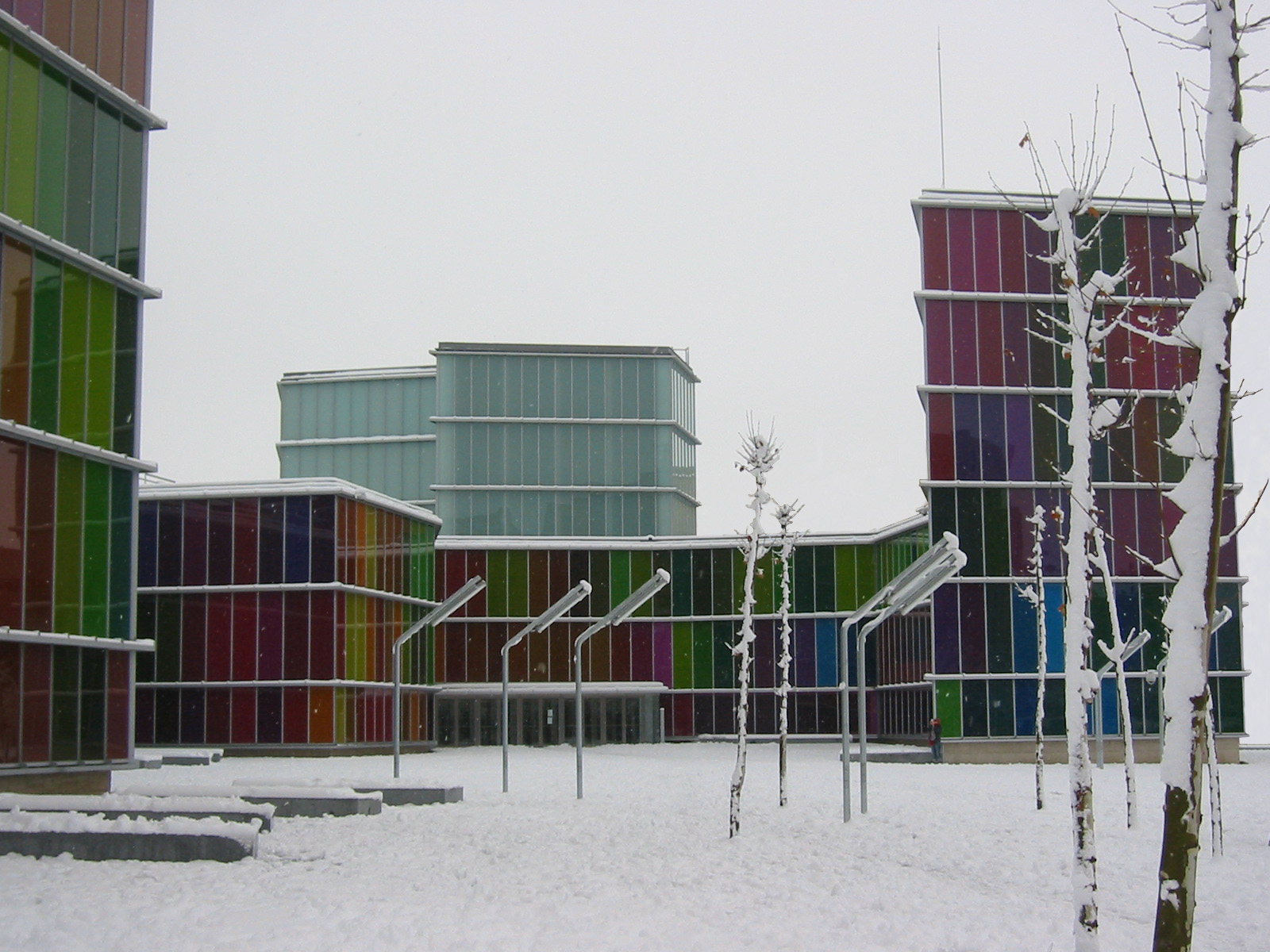
MUSAC
Mansilla + Tuñón
León, Spain

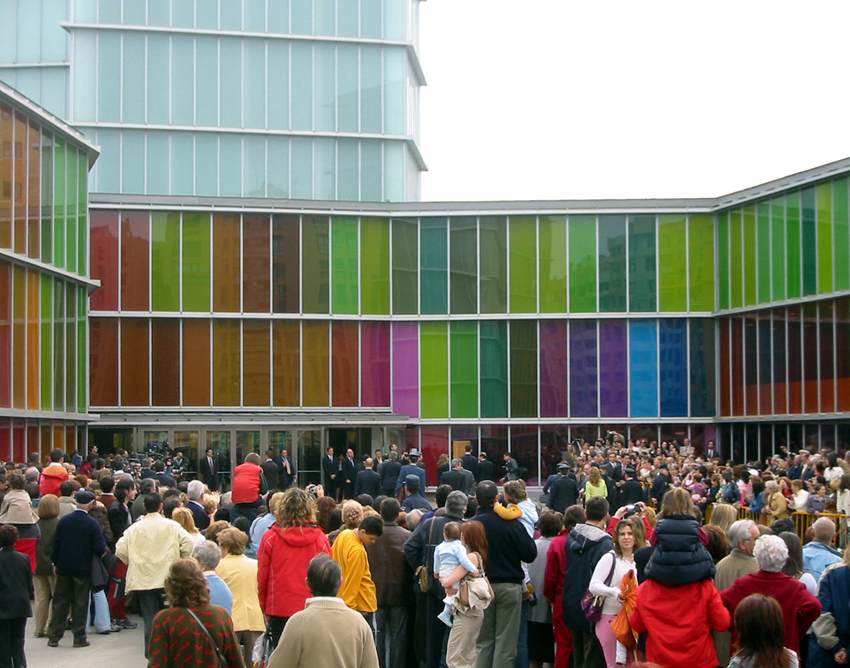
MUSAC
Mansilla + Tuñón
León, Spain

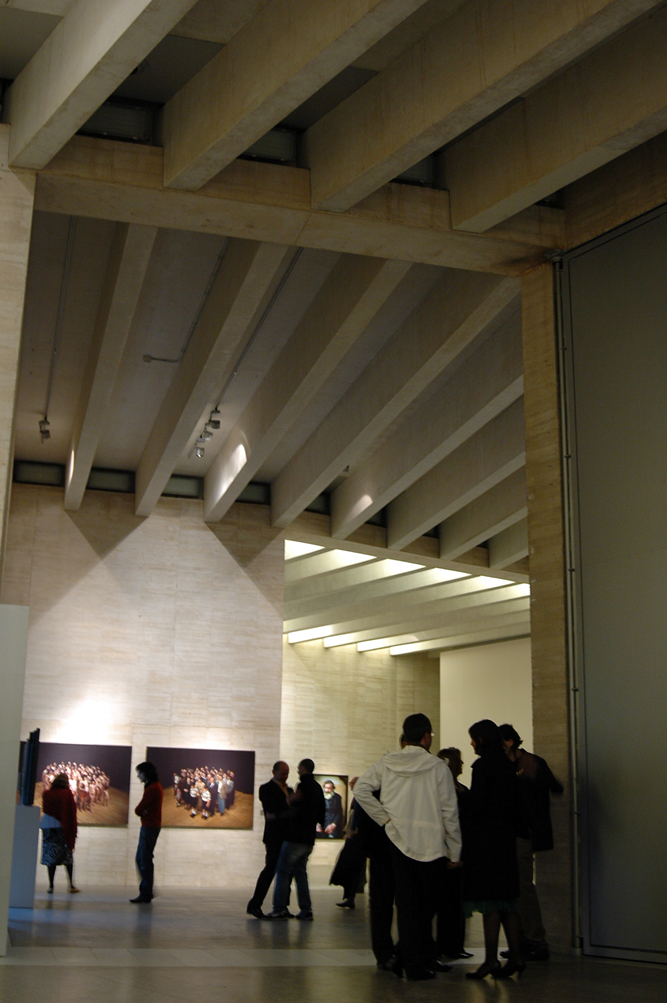
MUSAC
Mansilla + Tuñón
León, Spain

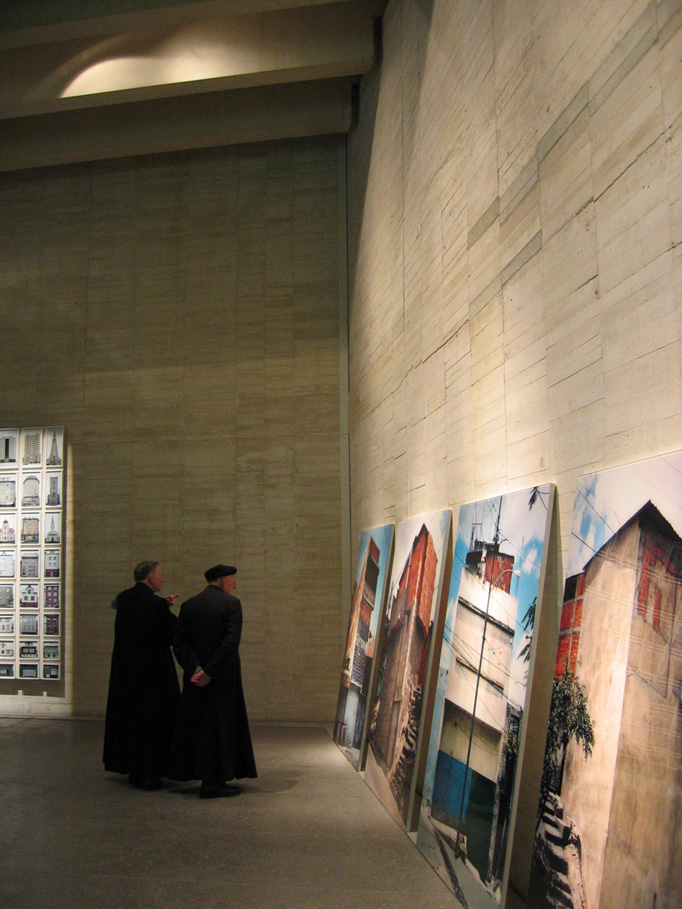
MUSAC
Mansilla + Tuñón
León, Spain

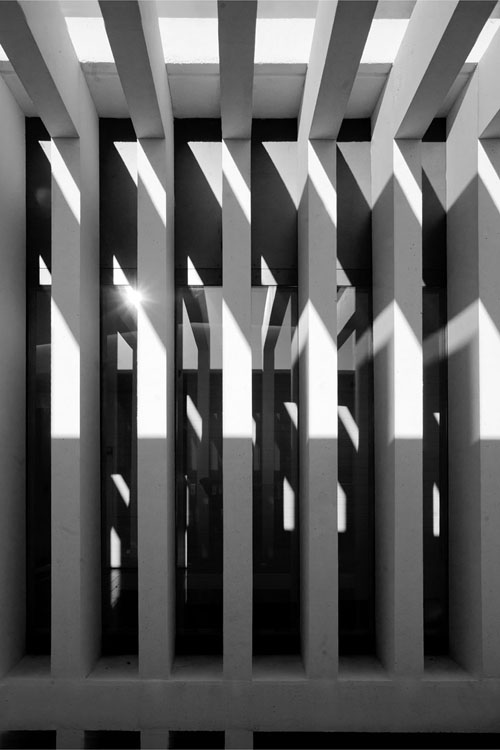
Relais & Châteaux Atrio
Mansilla + Tuñón
Cáceres, Spain

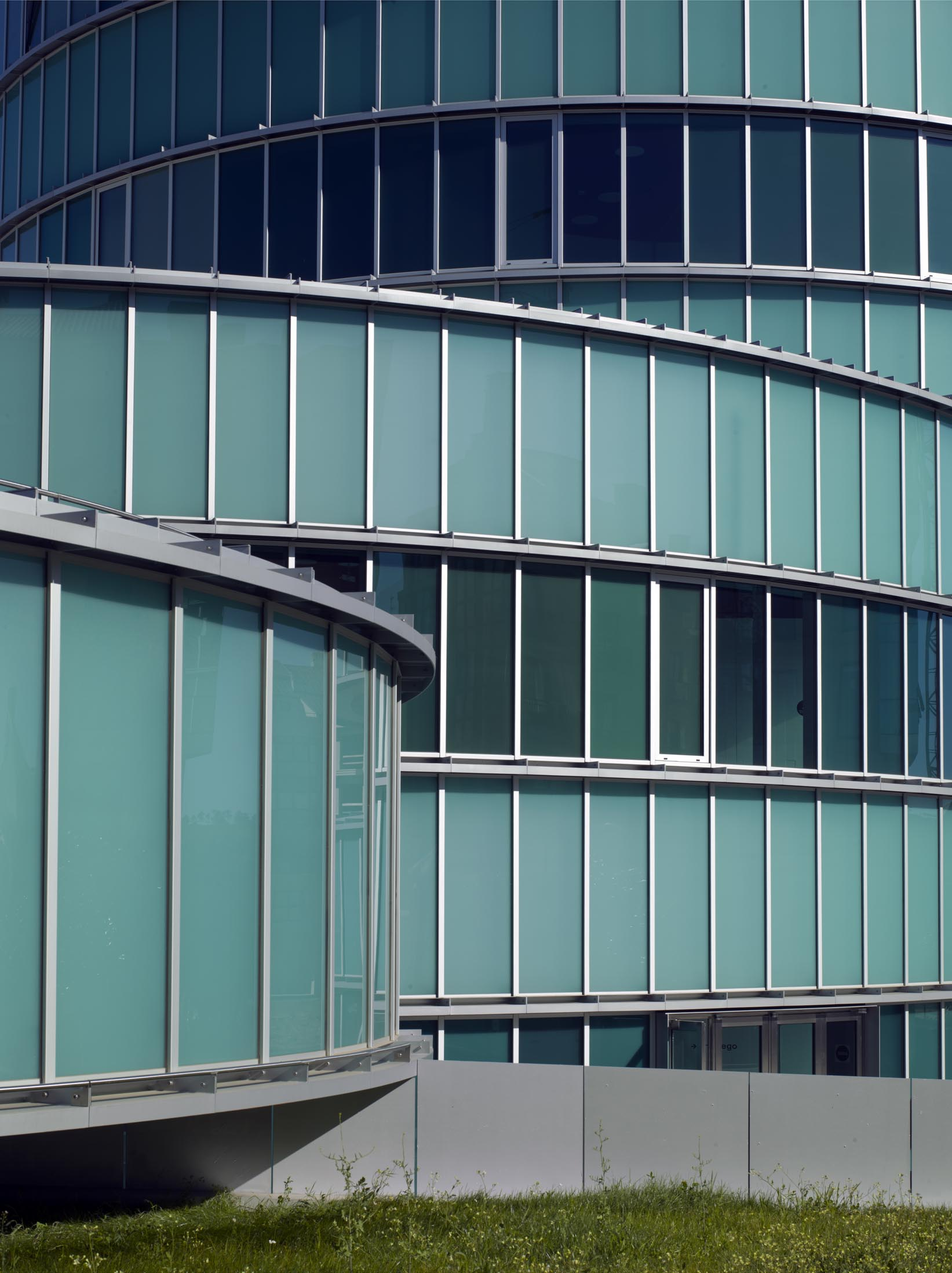
Lalín Town Hall
Mansilla + Tuñón
Galicia, Spain

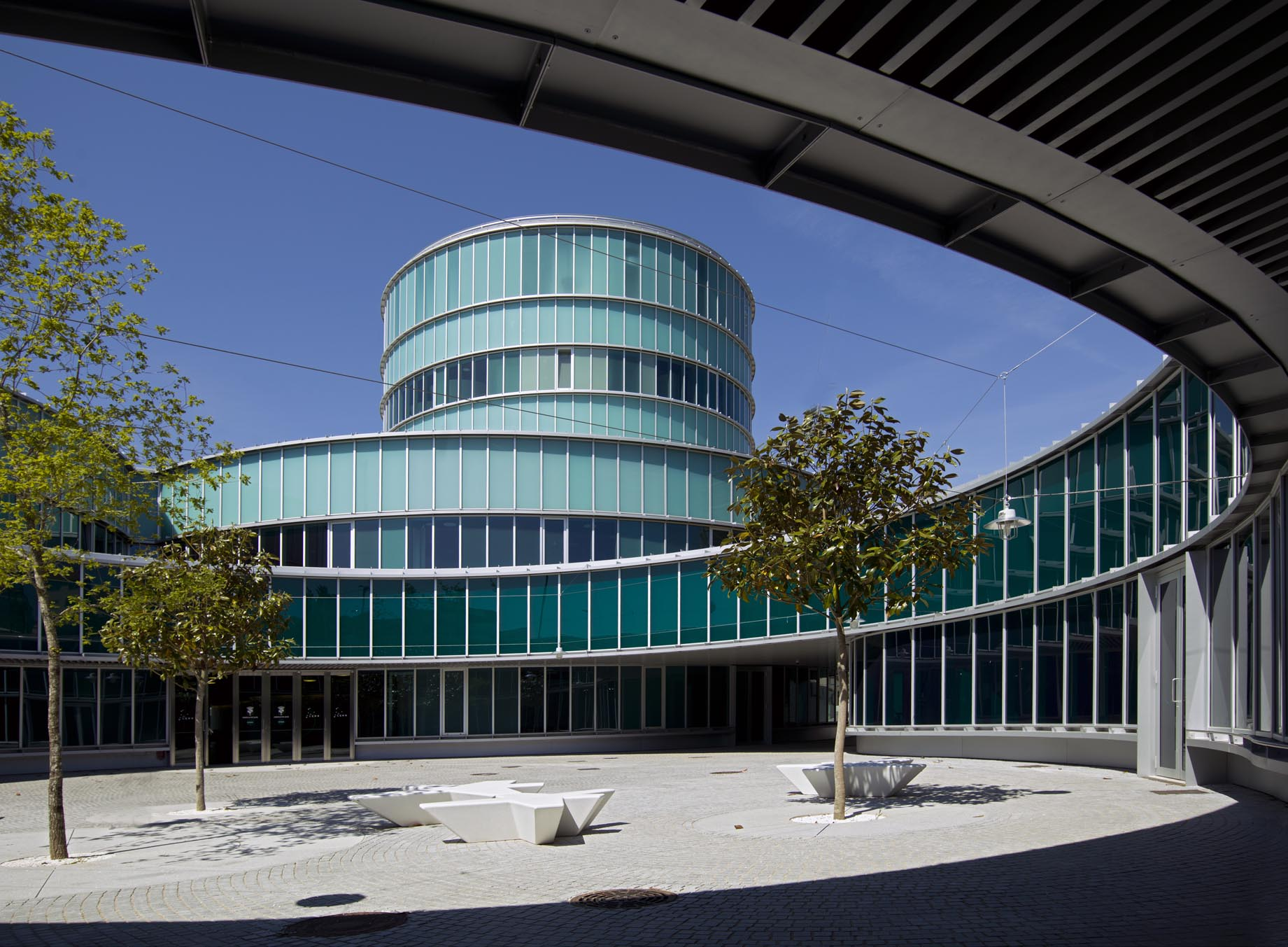
Lalín Town Hall
Mansilla + Tuñón
Galicia, Spain

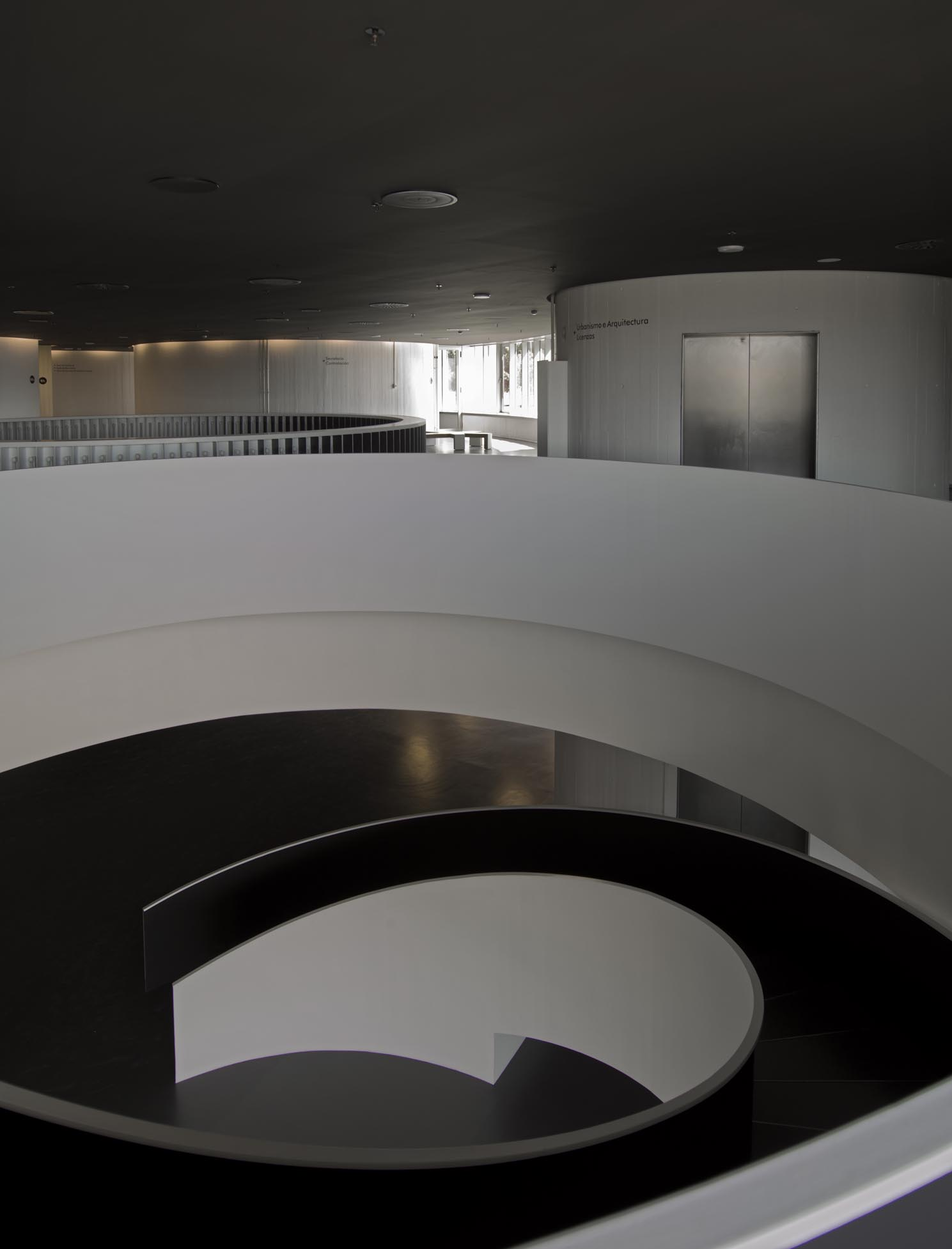
Lalín Town Hall
Mansilla + Tuñón
Galicia, Spain
