= Emilio Tuñón =

Spanish architect (born 1959)

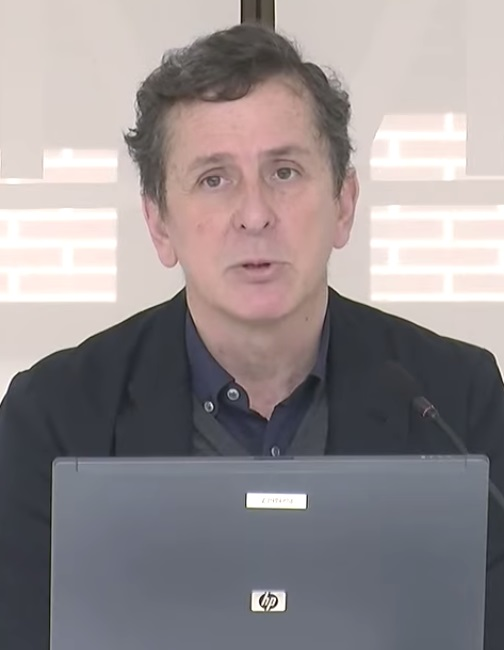
Emilio Tuñón (2015).

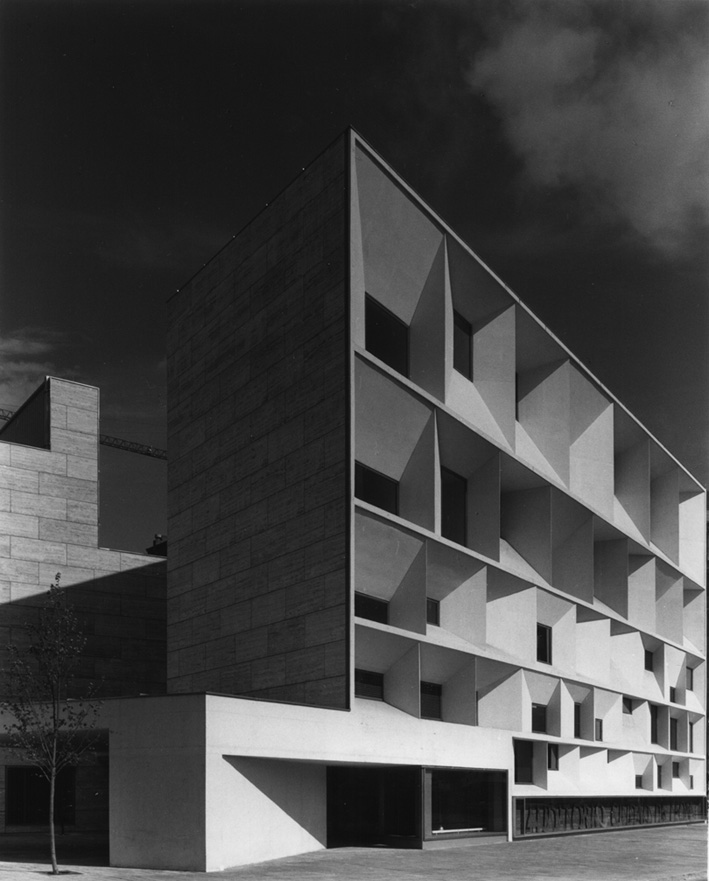
Auditorium, Leon

Emilio Tuñón Álvarez (born 1 January 1959 in Madrid) is a Spanish architect. In 2014, Mansilla + Tuñón Architects received the Gold Medal of Merit in the Fine Arts (Spain) from the Spanish Ministry of Culture.

Alvarez graduated from the ETSAM School of Architecture in 1981, obtaining a PhD in 1998. He was with the Fine Arts Cultural Department (1982) and the Architecture Public Works and Urban Planning Department (1983). Until 1992, he worked in the office of Spanish architect Rafael Moneo. In 1992, Alvarez and Luis Moreno Mansilla established the architecture firm Mansilla + Tuñón Architects.

Tuñón is a professor of ETSAM's architectural design department and has been visiting professor in several universities: Harvard University Graduate School of Design, Ecole Polytechnique Fédérale de Lausanne, Frankfurt Städelschule, Navarra Architecture School, Barcelona Architecture School, New Puerto Rico Architecture School.

Projects completed by Mansilla + Tuñón Architects include: Pedro Barrié de la Maza Foundation in Vigo (2005), Museo de Arte Contemporáneo de Castilla y León (2004), Auditorium of León (2003), Madrid Regional Documentary Centre (2002) Fine Arts Museum of Castellón (2000), Indoor Swimming-Pool in San Fernando de Henares (1998), Archeological and Fine Arts Provincial Museum of Zamora (1996) and the Royal Collections Museum in Madrid, which is currently under construction.

== Awards ==
- Spanish Architecture Award (2003)
- Mies van der Rohe Award for European Architecture for MUSAC) (2007)
- Gold Medal of Merit in the Fine Arts (Medalla de Oro al mérito en las Bellas Artes) (2014)
- Francqui Chair (2014) Francqui Foundation
- Spanish Architecture Award (2017)

== Gallery ==
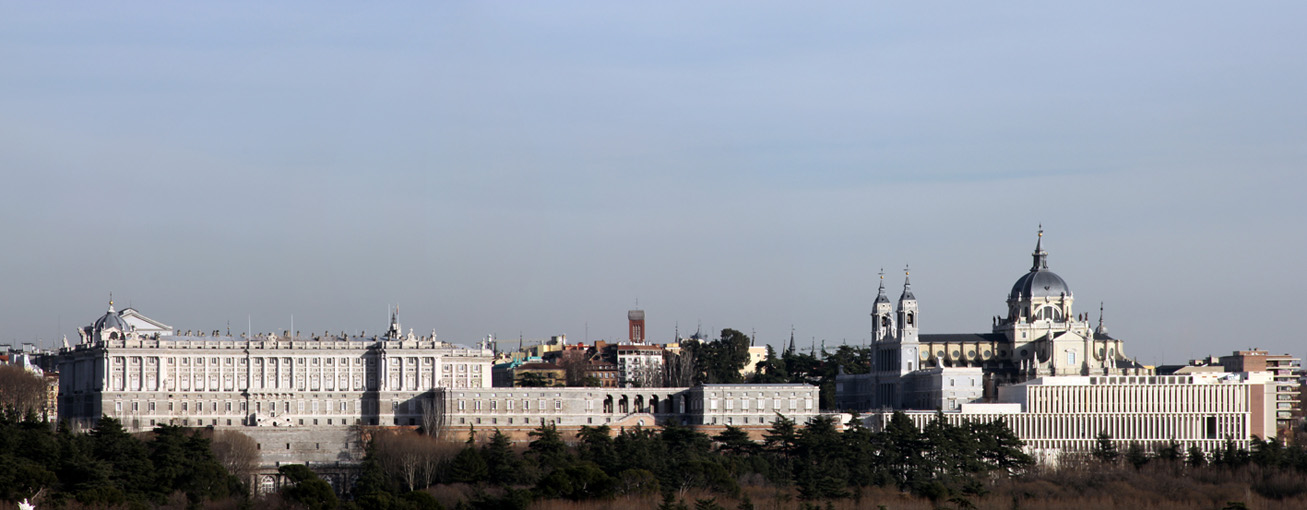
Royal Collections Museum, Madrid

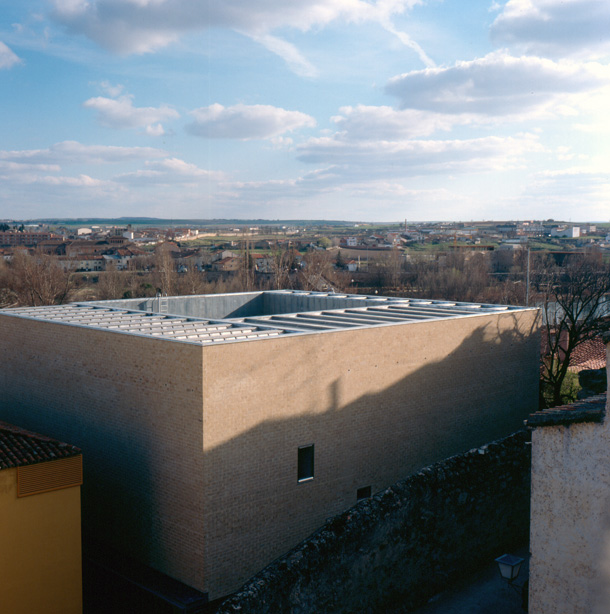
Regional Museum of Zamora, Zamora

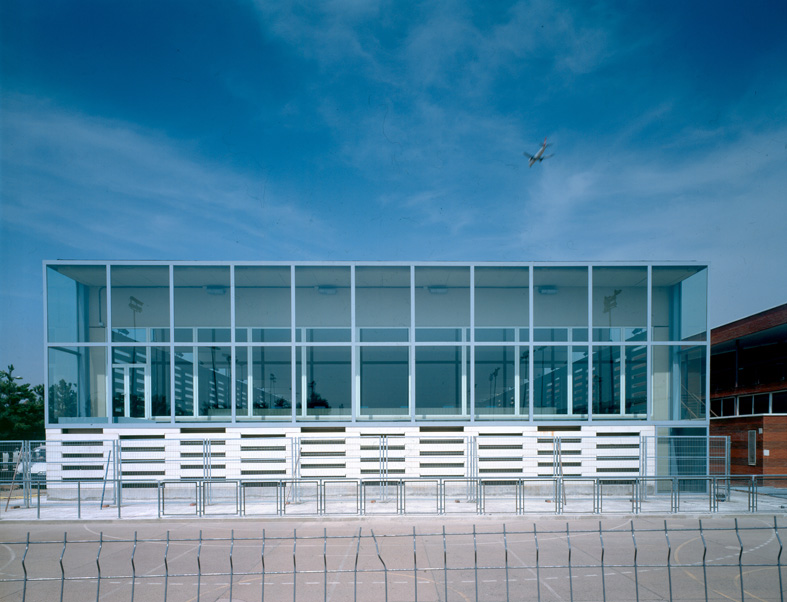
San Fernando de Henares Indoor Swimming-pool, Madrid

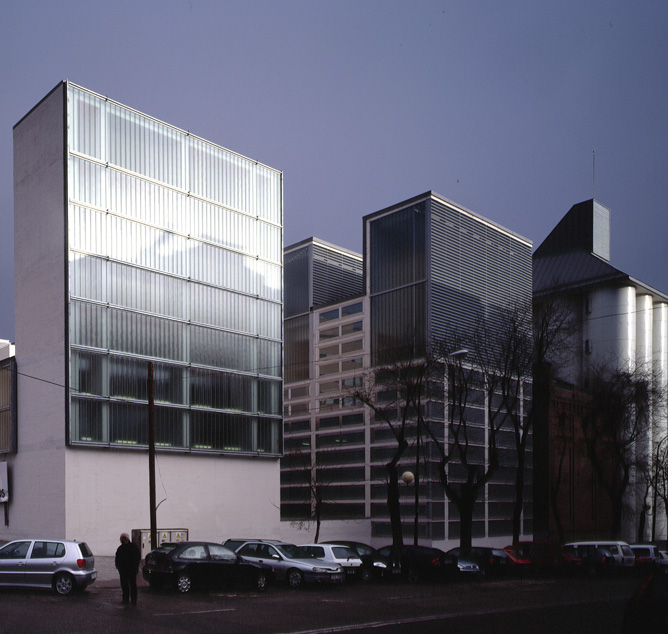
Regional Library and Archives in the former "El Águila" Brewery, Madrid

== Literature ==
- Luis Mansilla. Emilio Tuñón: Mansilla + Tuñón 1992–2012. In: El Croquis. Nr. 161, 2012, ISBN 978-84-88386-71-7.
- Luis Fernández-Galiano: Mansilla + Tuñón 1992–2011. In: AV Monographs. Nr. 144, 2010, ISSN 0213-487X
