= FIBES Conference and Exhibition Centre =

Building in the province of Seville, Spain

FIBES
- Palacio de Congresos y Exposiciones de Sevilla
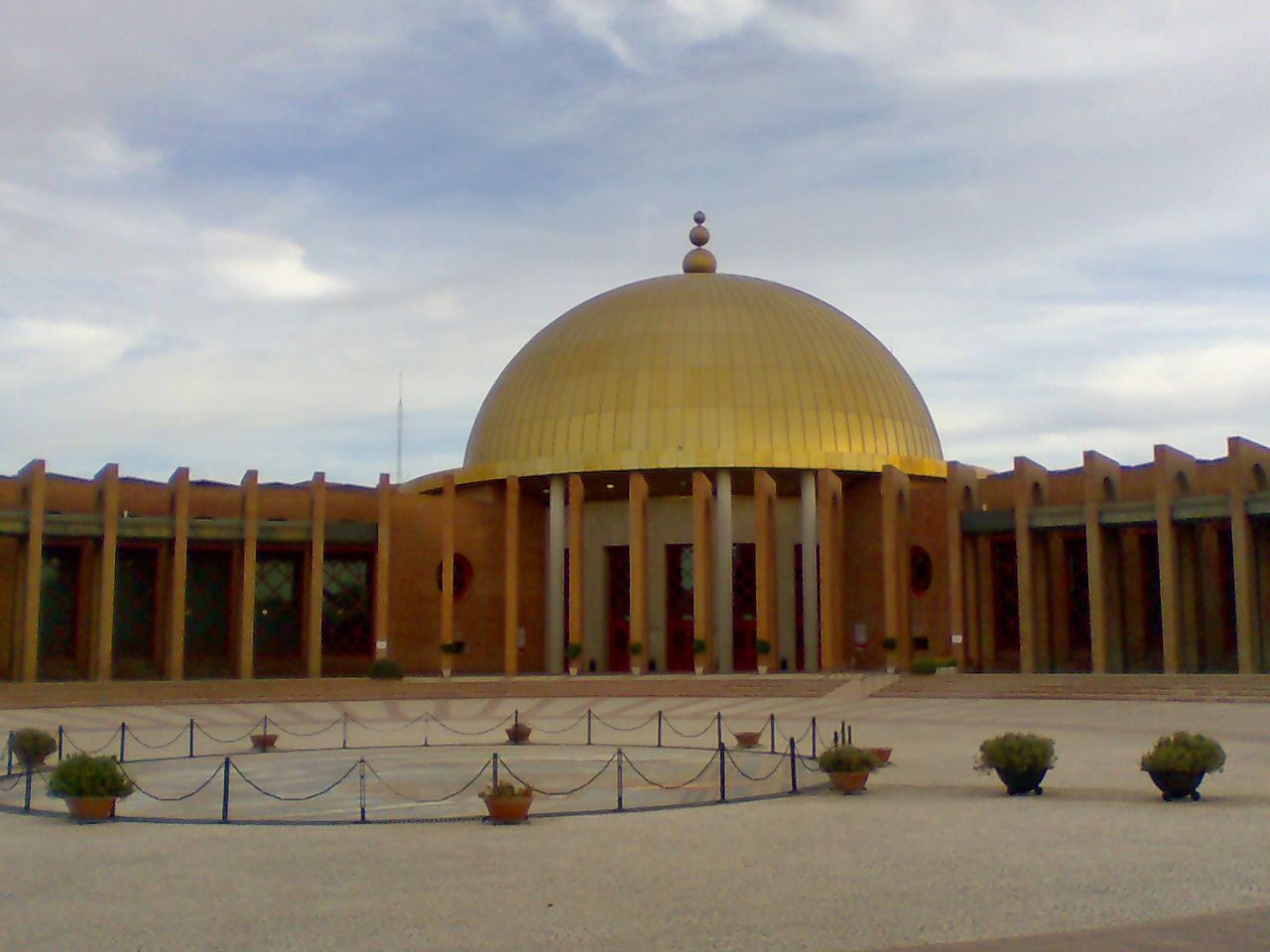
- FIBES I in August 2008.
- Interactive map of FIBES
- Address: Avenida Alcalde Luis Uruñuela 1
- Location: Seville, Andalusia, Spain
- Coordinates: 37°24′16″N 5°55′57″W
- Capacity: 3,550 (FIBES II auditorium)

Construction
- Opened: 1989
- Expanded: 2012
- Architects: Álvaro Navarro Jiménez (1989); Guillermo Vázquez Consuegra (2012)

Website
- www.fibes.es/en/

The Conference and Exhibition Centre of Seville (Spanish: Palacio de Congresos y Exposiciones de Sevilla), usually referred to as FIBES or Fibes, is a conference and exhibition centre in Seville, Andalusia, Spain. The centre consists of two buildings, FIBES I and FIBES II, which are connected by a footbridge.

== History ==
In the 1980s, FIBES (an acronym that stands for Feria Iberoamericana de Sevilla, Spanish for Ibero-American Exhibition of Seville), an entity that organized congresses and exhibitions in Seville, promoted a permanent venue for their activities, and in 1989, FIBES moved to the building purposely designed by Álvaro Navarro Jiménez. In September 2012, the centre was expanded with FIBES II, a building designed by Guillermo Vázquez Consuegra that includes a 3,550-seat auditorium.

In 2015, FIBES was dissolved as a society, and the Seville City Council assumed both buildings.

== Description ==
FIBES I contains three 7,200-square-meter pavilions without any columns intended for exhibitions and trade fairs. FIBES II contains a 3,550-seat auditorium.

== Events ==
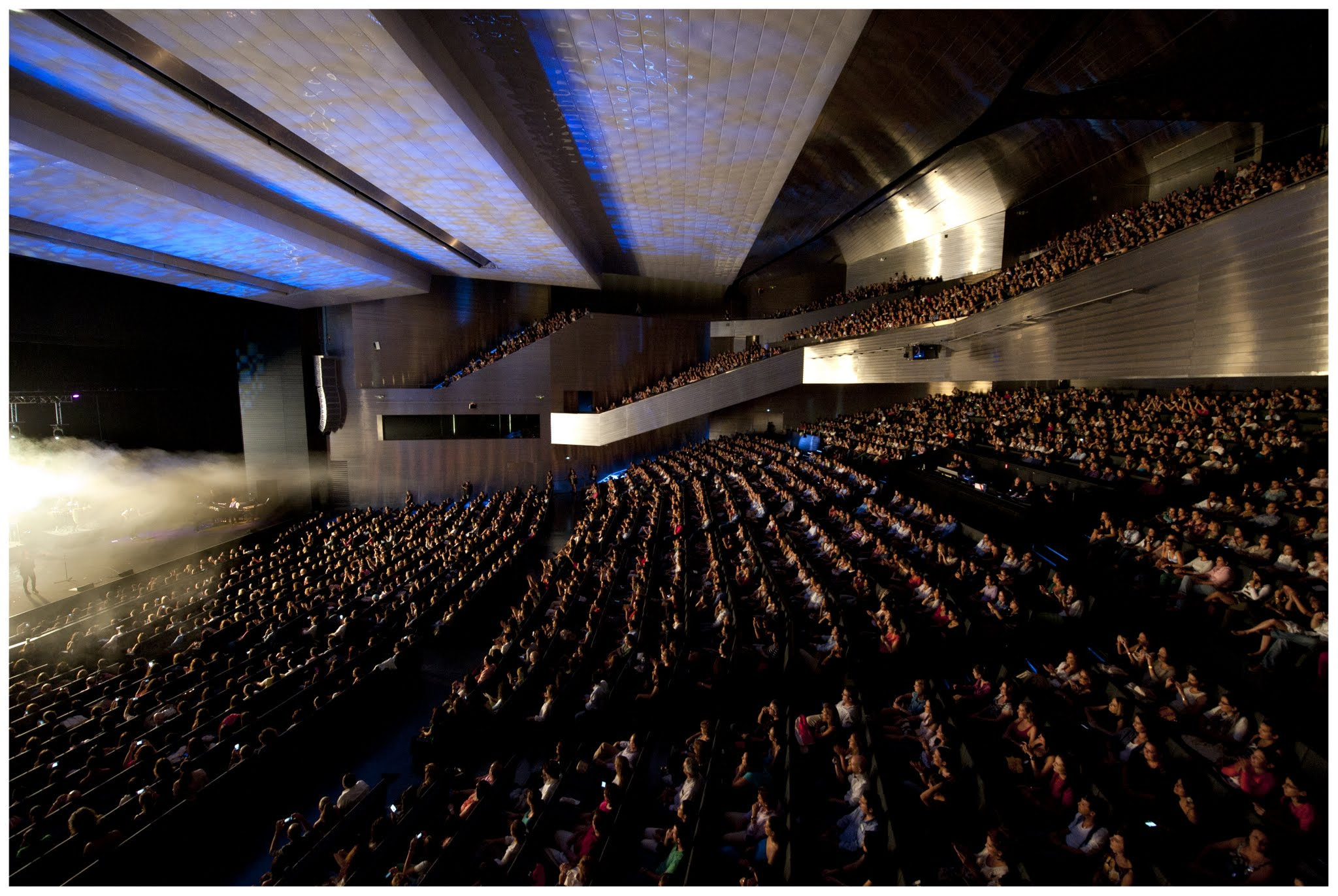
View of the FIBES II auditorium.

Several social, cultural and industrial fairs are regularly held in the FIBES facilities, as well as national and international congresses. In June 2002, the venue hosted the 91st EU Summit, and in 2007 it hosted an informal meeting of NATO.

FIBES II has hosted the Goya Awards twice: the 33rd ceremony on 2 February 2019, and the 37th ceremony on 11 February 2023. On 3 November 2019, FIBES hosted the 2019 MTV Europe Music Awards.

FIBES hosted the 24th Annual Latin Grammy Awards on November 16, 2023, which was the first edition of the Latin Grammy Awards to be held outside of the United States.
