= Liliana Palaia Pérez =

Argentine-born architect and painter (born 1951)

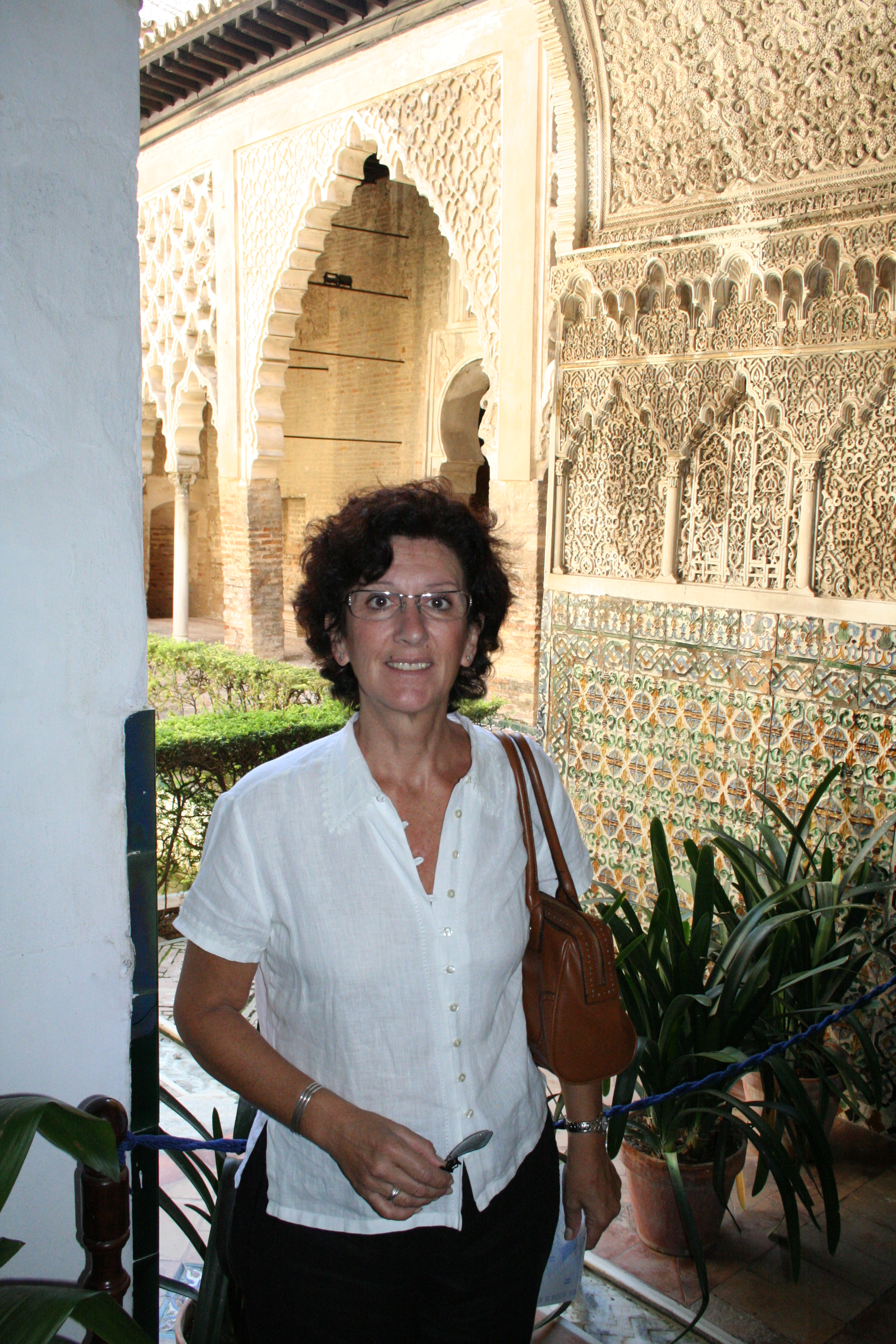
- Born: 1951 (age 74–75); Buenos Aires, Argentina
- Education: Higher Technical School of Architecture of Valencia
- Occupations: Architect, painter

Liliana Palaia Pérez (born 1951) is an Argentine-born architect and painter who resides and works in Valencia, Spain.

== Biography ==
Liliana Palaia Pérez studied architecture at the Faculty of Architecture, Design, and Urban Planning of the University of Buenos Aires, where she obtained her degree in 1974. She moved to Valencia, Spain for family reasons in May 1975, qualifying for the Higher Architect title at the Higher Technical School of Architecture (ETSAV). She soon returned to ETSAV to complete her Doctoral courses, culminating with the defense of her thesis Funciones y desarrollo del mercado central de Valencia, y sus implicaciones en la vida urbana (Functions and Development of the Central Market of Valencia, and its Implications for Urban Life) in 1982, directed by Dr. Pedro Navascués.

In 1978 she was hired as Professor in charge of ETSAV's Construction Department, becoming a full-time Collaborating Professor in 1984. She obtained the position of Associate Professor in 1986, and Full Professor in 2000, working at the university until she retired in 2012.

In 1984 she completed the ICCROM International Course on Wood Conservation Technology, taught in Trondheim, Norway, specializing in the field of conservation of historic wooden structures. From 1987 to 1989 she moved to England on an academic visa to complete the course Historic Building Conservation at the Architectural Association School of Architecture in London. There she attained a Diploma in Building Conservation, after her defense of the thesis Compatible Systems of Repair in Arches, Vaults and Domes (07-1989). The research work for her chair was carried out from 1998 to 2000 on overlapping roof structures in historical buildings of the Valencian Community.

She also freely practiced her profession from 1978 to 1984, when she focused on her teaching and research work.

== Architectural work ==
From 1978 to 1984, the year in which she became exclusively dedicated to the Technical University of Valencia, Palaia Pérez worked on new construction projects for housing structures in the city of Valencia, as well as several single-family homes in nearby towns. Since the approval of the Organic University Law (LOU), according to which she is allowed to conduct projects of investigative relevance through contracts with the university, she has carried out works related to the conservation of buildings, dedicating herself to this field since then, forming part of interdisciplinary teams to carry out studies and projects for the restoration, conservation, and rehabilitation of historic buildings.

== Painting and drawing ==
Since retiring as a Professor at the Technical University of Valencia, Liliana Palaia Pérez has taken courses in painting and drawing at that institution, beginning her artistic career. She has participated in several group exhibitions.

== Publications ==
- Funciones y desarrollo del Mercado Central de Valencia y sus implicaciones en la vida urbana. Palaia Pérez, Liliana; Navascués Palacio, Pedro. Higher Technical School of Architecture. Valencia: Technical University of Valencia, 1982
- El Mercado Central de Valencia. Esteban Chapapría, Julián; Palaia Pérez, Liliana; Madrid: Banco Santander, D.L. 1983
- Técnicas de intervención en elementos estructurales de madera. Palaia Pérez, Liliana; Master in Intervention Techniques in Architectural Heritage. Valencia: Technical University of Valencia, D.L. 1995
- Técnicas de intervención en arcos, bóvedas y cúpulas. Palaia Pérez, Liliana; Abdilla Muedra, Eugenio; Master in Intervention Techniques in Architectural Heritage. Valencia: Technical University of Valencia, D.L. 1995
- La conservación de la madera en los edificios antiguos. Palaia Pérez, Liliana; Technical University of Valencia, 1998, ISBN 9788477215707
- "El trazado y la construcción de armaduras de pares. Casos estudiados en la comunidad valenciana", Quaderns Científics I Tècnics De Restauració Monumental, Volume 13, 2002, Provincial Council of Barcelona
- Aprendiendo a construir la arquitectura. Benlloch Marco, Javier; Blanca Giménez, Vicente; Sifre Martínez, Vicente; Palaia Pérez, Liliana; Álvarez González, María Angeles; Gil Salvador, Luisa; López Mateu, Vicente; Tormo Esteve, Santiago, 2003, ISBN 9788497058551
- Vocabulario básico de construcción arquitectónica. Benlloch Marco, Javier; Palaia Pérez, Liliana; Álvarez González, María Angeles; Gil Salvador, Luisa; López Mateu, Vicente; Tormo Esteve, Santiago; Giner García, I., Valencia: Editorial UPV, D.L. 2005, ISBN 9789681871567
- Estructuras de madera. Pliego de Condiciones Técnicas en la edificación, Instituto Valenciano de la Edificación, 2010
- 24 Lecciones sobre conservación del patrimonio arquitectónico: su razón de ser: Master en Conservación del patrimonio arquitectónico (Título propio UPV). Palaia Pérez, Liliana; Tormo i Esteve, Santiago, Valencia: Technical University of Valencia, November 2012, ISBN 9788483639290
