= Museo de Arte Contemporáneo de Castilla y León =

Contemporary art museum in León, Spain

Coordinates: 42°36′24″N 5°34′56″W

Museo de Arte Contemporáneo de Castilla y León (MUSAC)
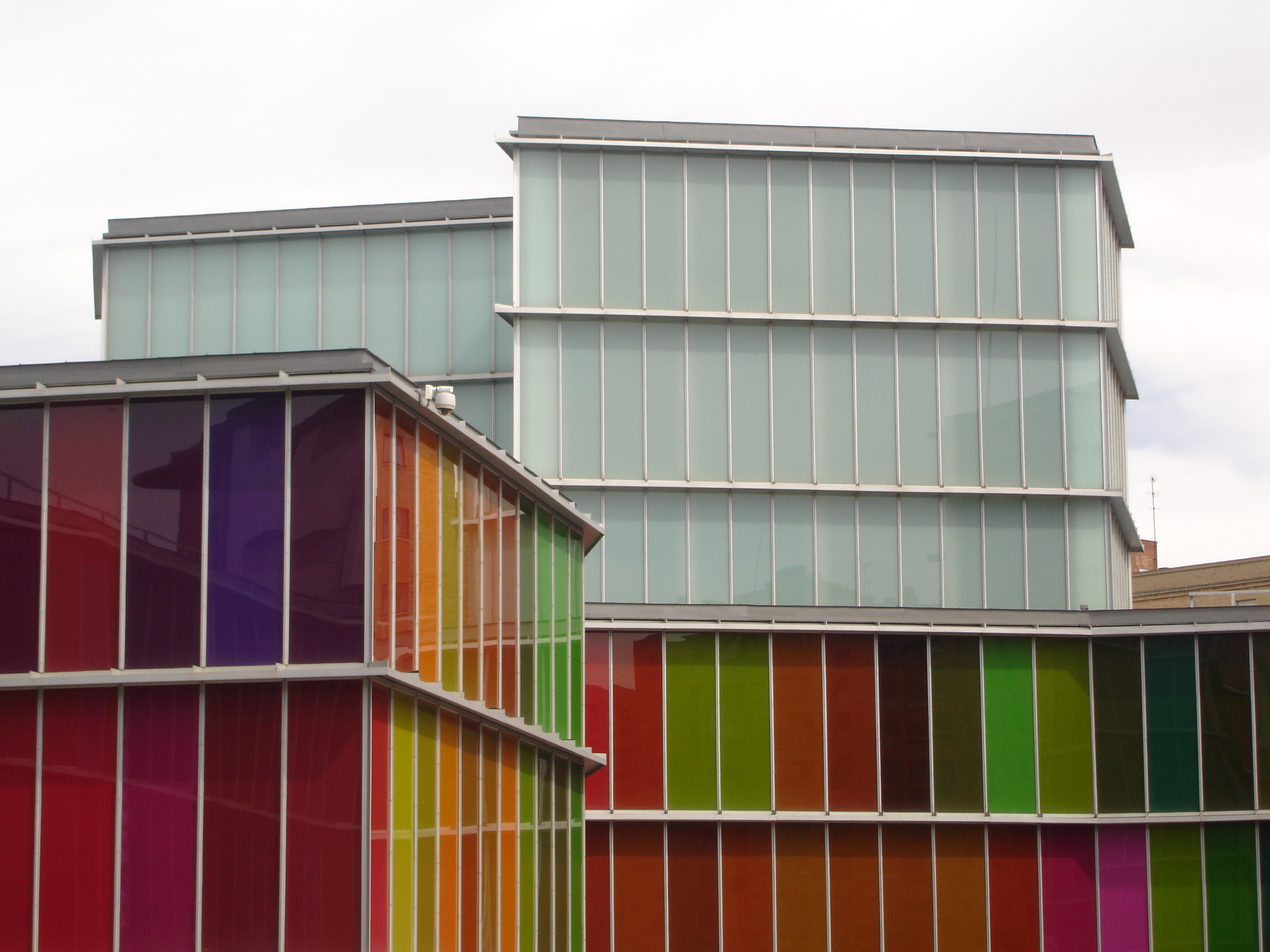
- Established: April 1, 2005
- Location: 24 Avenida de los Reyes Leoneses, León, Spain
- Visitors: 500.000
- Director: Álvaro Rodríguez Fominaya
- Website: www.musac.es

The Museo de Arte Contemporáneo de Castilla y León, better known as the MUSAC, is a contemporary art museum in the city of León, Spain.

Inaugurated in April 2005 by Felipe, Prince of Asturias, this cultural institution aims to be a "Museum of the Present", in the words of its curator Agustín Pérez Rubio, and thus only collects artworks from the latest generation of artists, between 1992 and 2012. The museum has won international prestige for its 21st-century collection and innovative programming, being labelled, for example, as "one of the most astonishingly bold museums to hit the Spanish cultural landscape in years" by The New York Times.

The MUSAC building is celebrated for its avant-garde architecture, and it has been awarded a number of prizes, such as the 2007 European Union Prize for Contemporary Architecture (Mies van der Rohe award). Designed by the architectural studio of Luis M. Mansilla and Emilio Tuñón (Mansilla+Tuñón Arquitectos), the multicolored panels that adorn the exterior of the museum resemble the stained-glass windows of a cathedral. The architects drew their inspiration for this work from the main rose window (called The Falconer) at the local 13th century Gothic cathedral, Santa María de León.

MUSAC has become a landmark for the city of León, and an emblem of the new 21st century Spanish architecture, as showcased in a 2006 exhibition at the MoMA of New York City (On-Site: New Architecture in Spain), which selected the MUSAC as one of the arquitectural projects that make Spain today "an international center for design innovation and excellence".

== Gallery ==
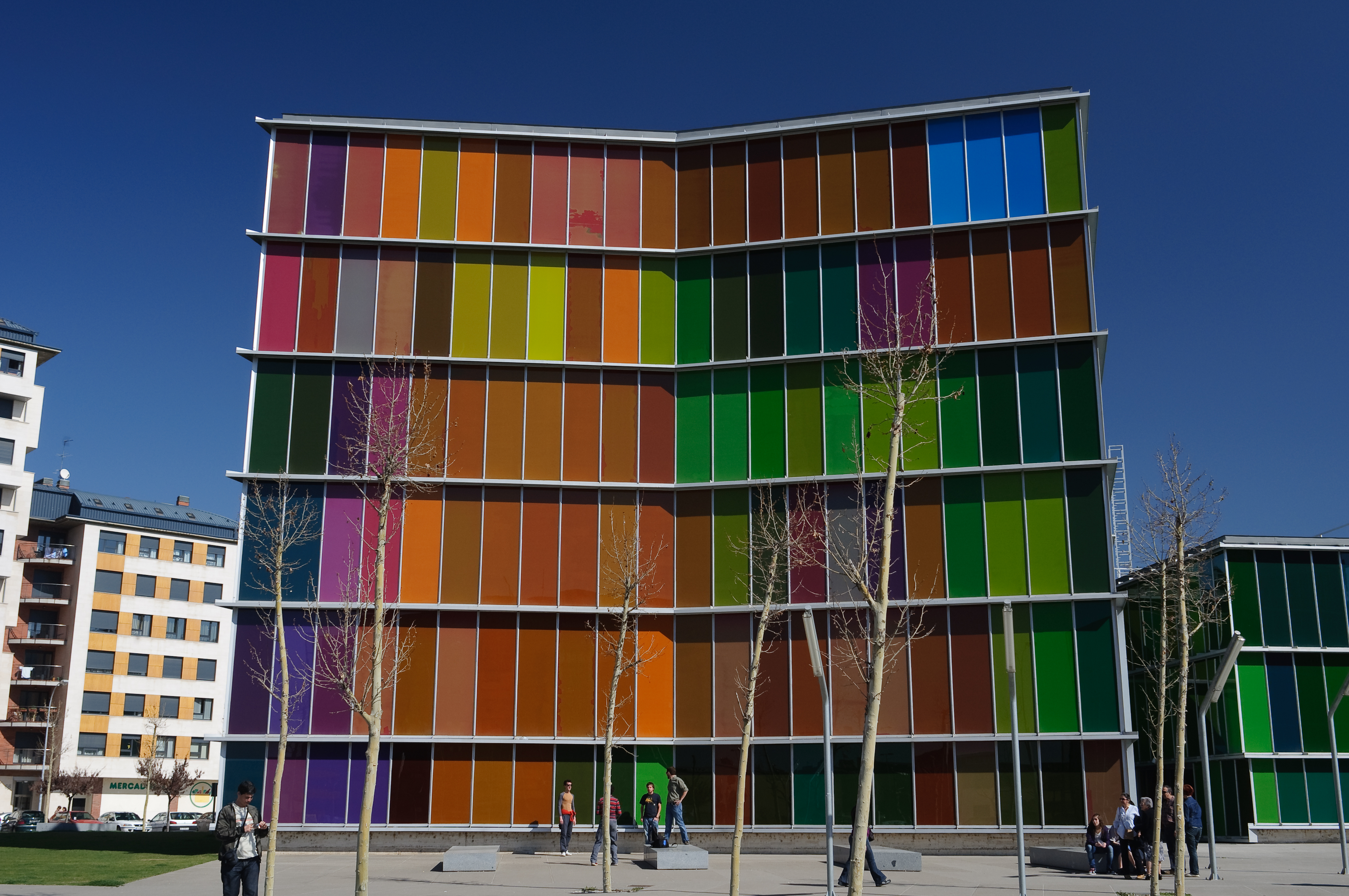
Facade

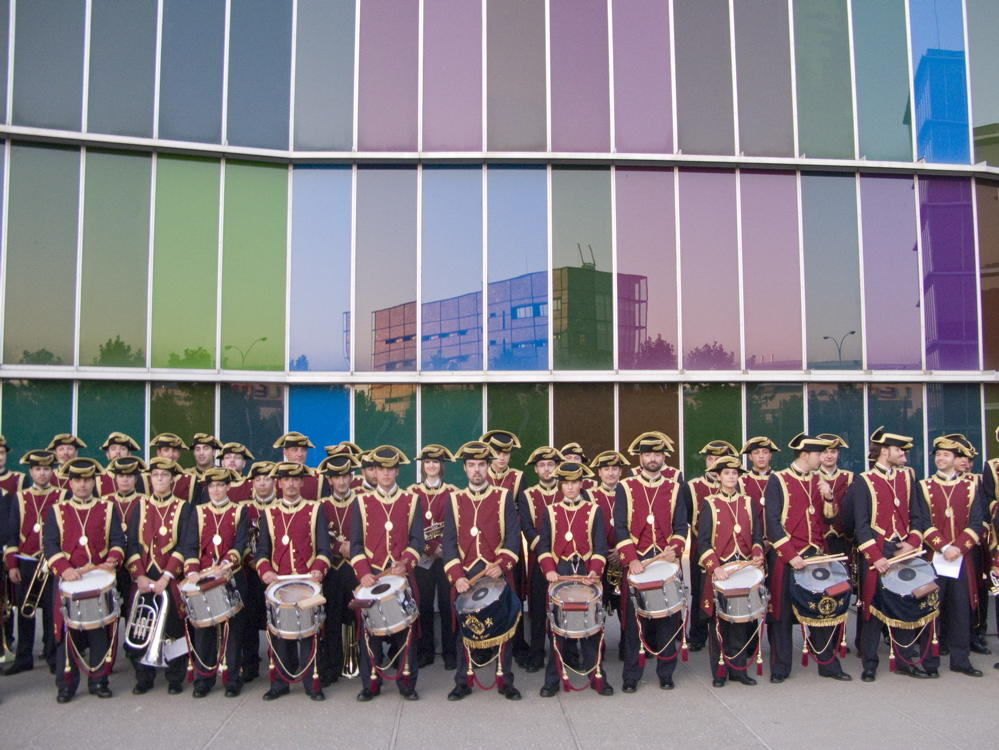
AMIKEJO at MUSAC with Fermín Jiménez Landa & Lee Welch

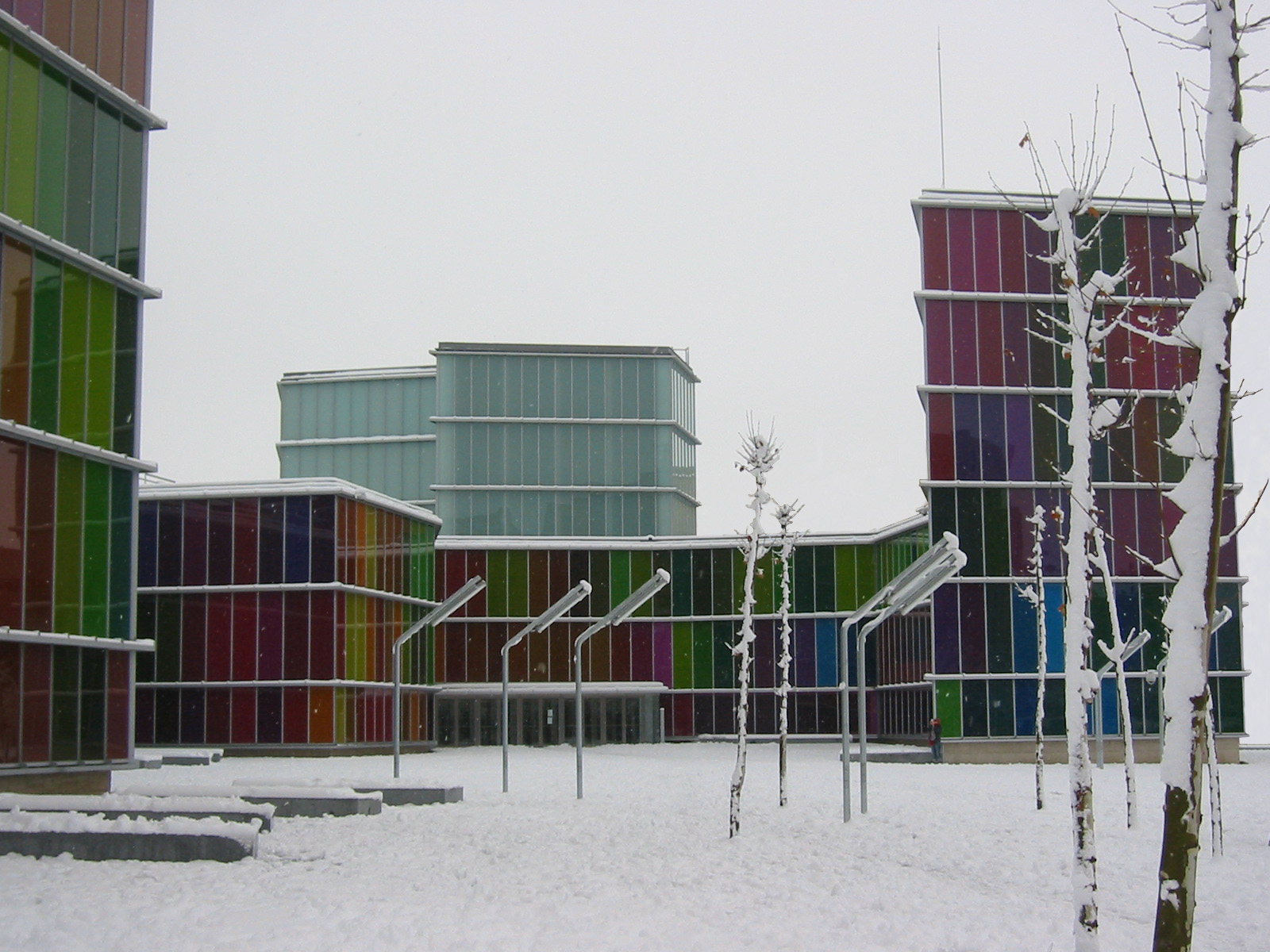
A view of MUSAC on a winter's day

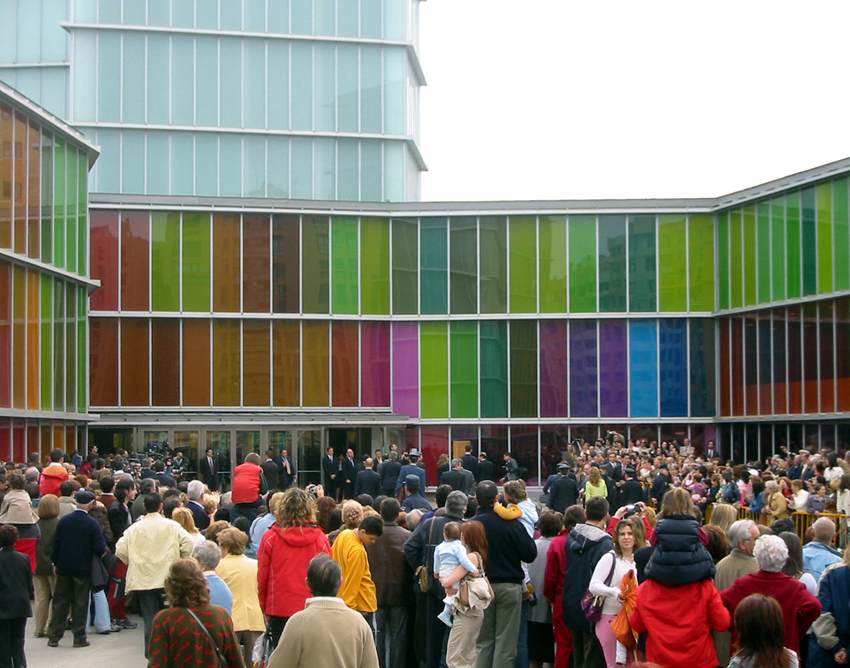
MUSAC during its opening.

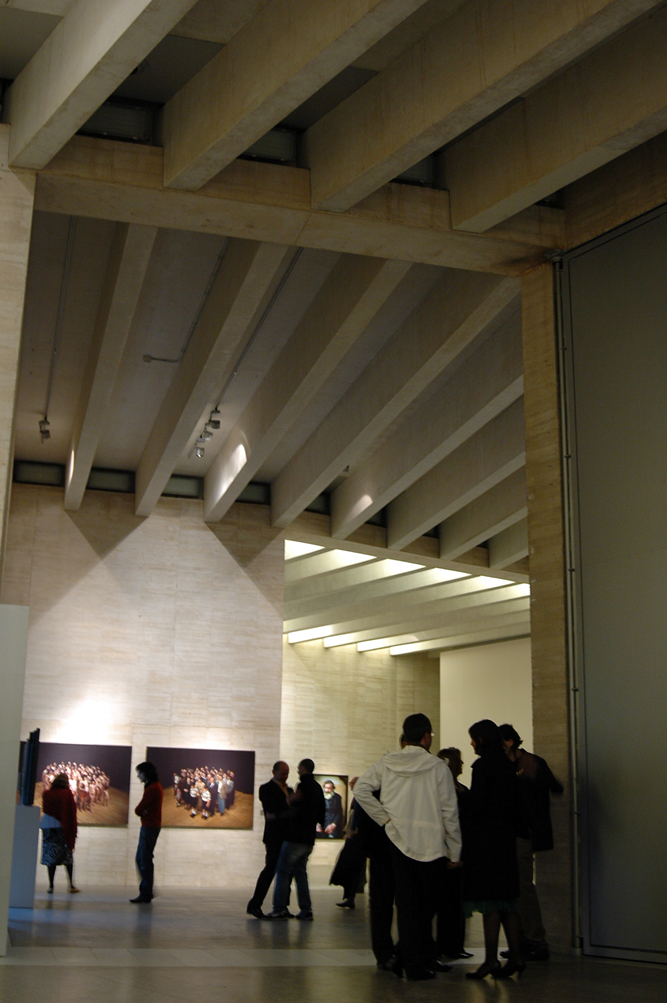
MUSAC interior.

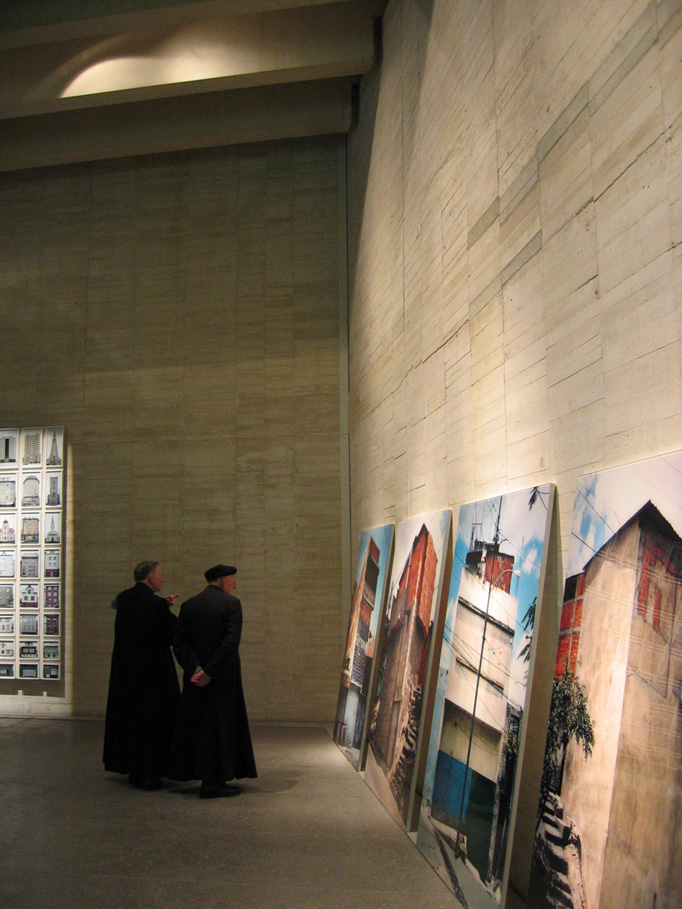
MUSAC interior.
