= Luis Moreno Mansilla =

Spanish architect (1959–2012)

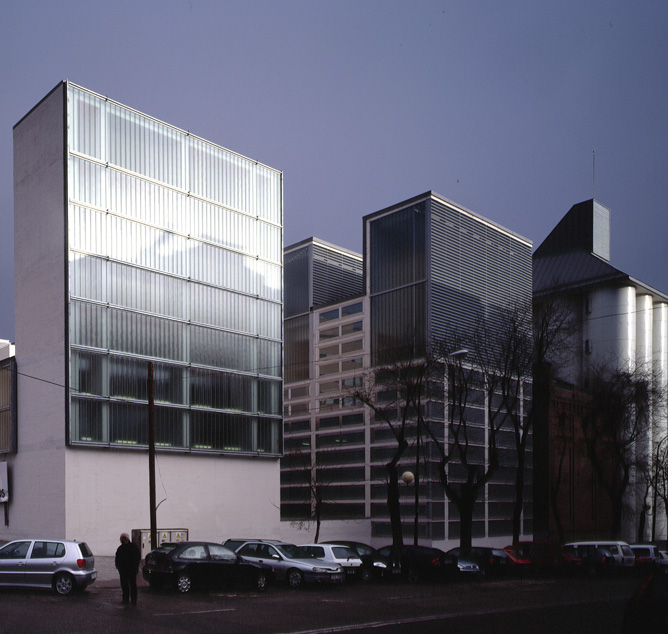
Arts and Culture Regional Center of Madrid in the former El Águila brewery

Luis M. Mansilla (1959 in Madrid – 2012 in Barcelona), was a Spanish architect. He graduated from the E.T.S.A.M. on 1982, and obtained the Ph. degree on 1998. In 1984 he was fellow of the Spanish Academy in Rome, and in 1987 obtained the Swedish Institute Scholarship in Stockholm.

During the 1980s, he actively participated in the cultural scene of the so-called “La Movida”. A time when he developed enduring friendships with artists Sigfrido Martín Begué and Guillermo Pérez Villalta, that strongly influenced his own work. In 1992, Mansilla and Emilio Tuñón established the architecture firm Mansilla + Tuñón Architects, that operated until short after he died. The office worked at the intersection of theory, pedagogy and practice. It received the Spanish Architecture Award in 2003 and 2017, and the Mies van der Rohe prize in 2007.

Mansilla was a full professor in the Architecture School of Madrid and had been a visiting professor in Harvard University Graduate School of Design, the Ecole Polytechnique Fédérale de Lausanne, and the School of Architecture at Princeton University.
