= Consejo Superior de los Colegios de Arquitectos de España =

The Consejo Superior de los Colegios de Arquitectos de España (CSCAE), (English: Superior Council of the Colleges of Architects of Spain) is the higher council of Architects Associations in Spain, and is the only established professional body of Spanish architects, located in the Paseo de la Castellana, Madrid.

The foundation of the CSCAE was initialized by the council of architects in 1929, established by law by government decree of June 13, 1931, which was ratified by the Spanish constitutional court (Spanish: Cortes Constituyentes) on November 4, 1931.

The CSCAE established the Gold Medal for Spanish Architecture in 1981.

The CSCAE includes 17 regional councils today, originally it had the following six regional councils:

- Council of the provinces A Coruña, Lugo, Ourense, Pontevedra, Oviedo, León, Zamora, Salamanca and Palencia, located in León
- Council of the provinces Álava, Vizcaya, Guipúzcoa and Navarra, located in Bilbao
- Council of the provinces Lleida, Girona, Barcelona, Tarragona, Huesca, Zaragoza, Teruel, Logroño and Baleares, located in Lleida
- Council of the provinces Santander, Burgos, Soria, Segovia, Ávila, Madrid, Toledo, Ciudad Real, Cuenca, Guadalajara, Cáceres, Badajoz and Valladolid, located in Madrid
- Council of the provinces Castellón, Valencia, Alicante, Albacete and Murcia, located in [Valencia]
- Council of the provinces Huelva, Sevilla, Córdoba; Jaén, Granada, Almería; Málaga, Cádiz, África norte and Canarias, located in Sevilla

Now it includes Galicia [COAG], Asturias, Cantabria, Castilla y León (oeste), Castilla y León (este), La Rioja, Aragón, Cataluña, Valencia, Baleares, Murcia, Castilla La Mancha, Extremadura, Andalucía [CACOA], Canarias y las ciudades autónomas de Ceuta y Melilla.
