= Rita Fernández Queimadelos =

Spanish architect

- Born: Rita Eugenia Fernández Benedicta Queimadelos; 1911; A Torre, Pontevedra, Galicia, Spain
- Died: September 26, 2008 (aged 96–97); Barcelona, Spain
- Occupation: architect

Rita Eugenia Fernández Benedicta Queimadelos (1911 - 26 September 2008) was a Spanish architect. She is considered the second, sometimes the third female architect in Spain. The first female architect to officially sign her own architectural projects in the state. She is also the first female architect in Galicia.

== Early life and education ==
Rita Fernández Queimadelos was born in 1911 in A Torre, a village in the municipality of A Cañiza, in the province of Pontevedra, Galicia, Spain. She was a daughter of Domingo Fernández y Fernández and Modesta Queimadelos Vázquez, merchants and owners of a haberdashery in the center of Orense. Fernández Queimadelos spent her childhood mainly in Orense and in A Torre during the summer holidays.

In 1928, she moved to Santiago de Compostela to live with her grandmother. There Fernández Queimadelos started her studies at the University of Santiago de Compostela by taking two courses in Chemical Sciences. In 1929, women gained access to the School of Architecture in Madrid for the first time. In 1930, Fernández Queimadelos moved to Madrid and stayed at the Residencia de Señoritas to prepare for admission to the School of Architecture. In the academic year 1930–1931, at the age of 19, she ultimately won admission to the School of Architecture in Madrid with the help of both her grandmothers and despite her father's initial objections. In 1932–33, Fernández Queimadelos entered the School and attended the so-called Preparatory Course 1, the first year of a total of six. Between 1932 and 1936 she finished four years at the university when her studies were interrupted by Spanish Civil War. In 1939-1940 Fernández Queimadelos continued her studies graduating in 1940. She became the third female architect in Spain after Matilde Ucelay Maortua who graduated in 1936, and María Cristina Gonzalo Pintor who graduated the same year as Fernández Queimadelos.

In 1941 Fernández Queimadelos acquired her architect license becoming the first female architect to officially sign her own architectural projects in Spain.

== Career ==
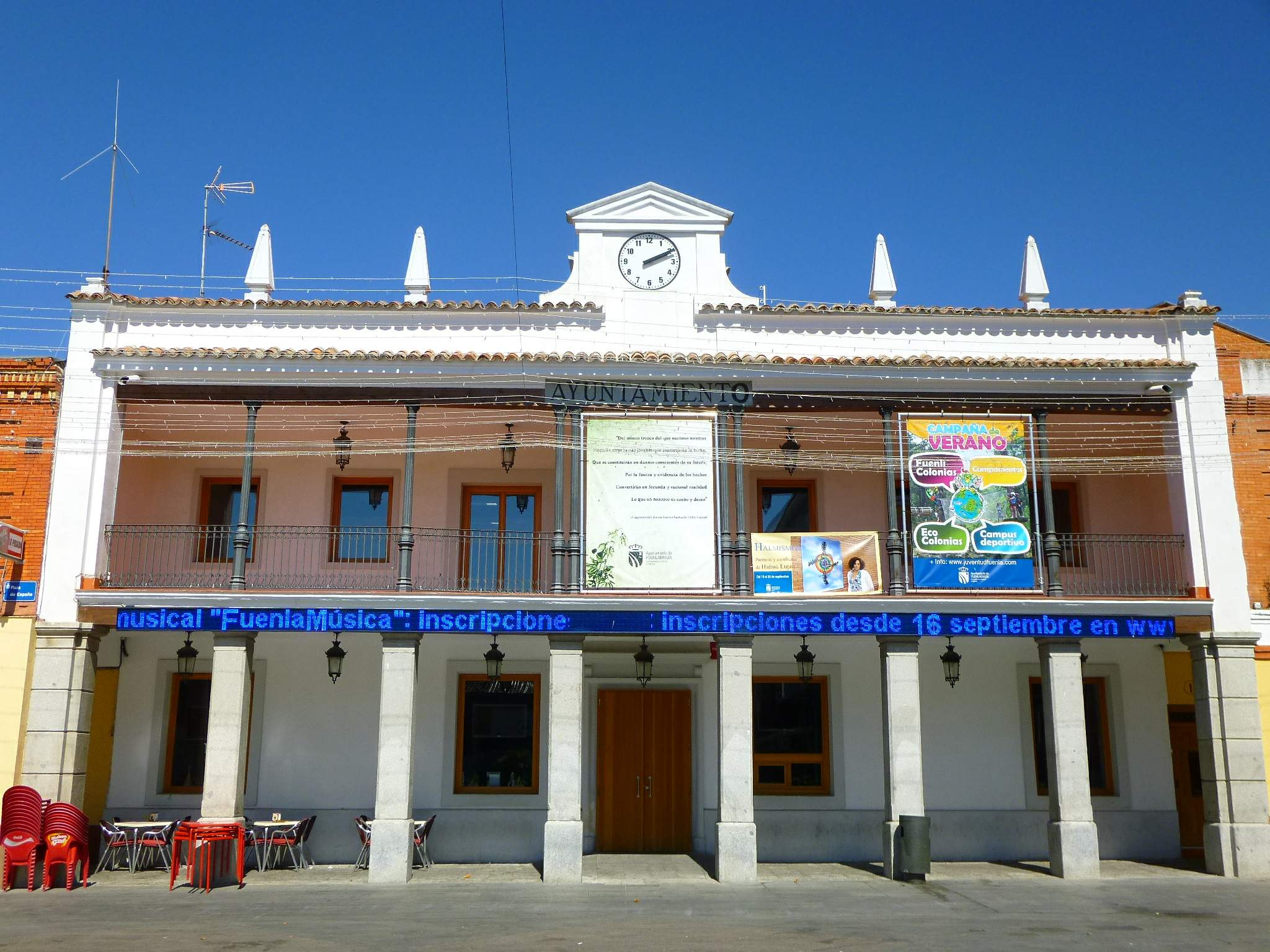
Building in Fuenlabrada designed by Rita Fernández Queimadelos

After graduation one of Fernández Queimadelos’ teachers Modesto López Otero offered her to work in the project of Devastated Regions of Madrid where she worked as an architect from 1941 in 1946. At the same time she worked as a freelance architect for the Crist real estate agency in Murcia and in Madrid. Fernández Queimadelos is considered the first freelance architect in Spain.

After the birth of her third daughter, Elena, in December 1947, she interrupted her professional practice for eight years. In 1955 Fernández Queimadelos settled in Murcia with her husband and children. There she opened a studio and worked as a provincial architect building schools from 1960 to 1967. From 1962 to 1967 Fernández Queimadelos worked as a Municipal Architect of Mula. In 1973, Fernández Queimadelos moved to Barcelona where her husband obtained the position of Professor of Applied Inorganic Chemistry at the Faculty of Pharmacy at the Central University of Barcelona. There she stopped her professional practice, except for some sporadic projects, retiring in 1979.

Rita Fernández Queimadelos died on 26 September 2008 in Barcelona at the age of 97.

== Personal life ==
In May 1942, Rita Fernández Queimadelos married Vicente Iranzo Rubio, a graduate of the Faculty of Science of the Central University of Madrid. They had six children: Vicente (1943), Rita (1945), Elena (1947), Dolores (1948), the fourth daughter who dies shortly after birth (1949) and Pilar (1952). Fernández Queimadelos’ daughter Elena died in 2004.
