= Guevara =

Guevara is a surname of Basque origin. Notable people with the surname include:

- Amado Guevara (born 1976), Honduran football (soccer) player
- Álvaro Guevara (1894–1951), Chilean painter
- Ander Guevara (born 1997), Spanish footballer for Real Sociedad
- Ángel Aníbal Guevara (born 1924), Guatemalan politician
- Antonio de Guevara (c. 1481 – 1545), Spanish chronicler and moralist
- Armando Guevara (born 1955), Venezuelan boxer
- Ava Rossana Guevara, Honduran politician
- Carla Guevara (born 1975), Filipino musical theatre actress
- Carlos Guevara (disambiguation), several people
- Ernesto "Che" Guevara (1928–1967), Argentine Marxist revolutionary, major figure in the Cuban Revolution
- Diego de Guevara (c. 1450 – 1520), Spanish diplomat and art collector
- Ena Guevara (born 1959), Peruvian long-distance runner
- Felipe de Guevara (died 1563), Spanish humanist
- Fernando Niño de Guevara (1541–1609), Spanish cardinal
- Gerardo Guevara (1930–2024), Ecuadorian composer
- Giomar Guevara (born 1972), Major League Baseball shortstop who played for the Seattle Mariners
- Hermógenes Leonel Guevara Mora (born 1979), Nicaraguan poet
- Hilda Guevara, Peruvian congresswoman
- Gregory Guevara (born 1997), Canadian YouTuber
- Íñigo Vélez de Guevara, Count consort of Oñate (1566–1644), Spanish diplomat and politician
- Isabel de Guevara (1530–1556), Spanish colonial chief
- Jesús Guevara (born 1969), Venezuelan heavyweight boxer
- Luis Vélez de Guevara (1579–1644), Spanish dramatist and novelist
- Manuel Guevara (born 1969), Venezuelan road cyclist
- Ruben Guevara (disambiguation), several people
- Sammy Guevara (born 1993), American professional wrestler
- Otto Guevara (born 1960), Costa Rican libertarian politician
- Tomás Guevara (1865–1935), Chilean historian, teacher and Mapuche scholar
