= Gebara (disambiguation) =

Gebara (Spanish: Guevara), is a small village and former municipality in the Basque Autonomous Community of Spain.

Gebara may also refer to:

- Andrew Gebara, United States Air Force major general
- Ivone Gebara (born 1944), Brazilian Catholic nun, philosopher, and feminist theologian
- Lotfi Jbara (born 1961), Tunisian footballer and football manager
- Paulette Gebara Farah, 4-year-old Mexican victim of a suspicious death

== See also ==
- Guevara, a surname
- Jbara, a surname
