= Jbara =

Jbara is a surname. Notable people with the surname include:

- Dan Jbara (1964–2020), American television and film producer
- Gregory Jbara (born 1961), American actor and singer
- Lotfi Jbara (born 1961), Tunisian footballer and football manager

== See also ==
- Gebara (disambiguation)
