= Michael Sittow =

Estonian painter (c. 1469 – 1525)

- Born: c. 1469; Reval (Tallinn), Estonia
- Died: 1525; Reval (Tallinn), Estonia
- Education: Hans Memling
- Known for: Painting, Portraits
- Movement: Early Netherlandish painting

Michael Sittow (c. 1469 – 1525), also known as Master Michiel, Michel Sittow, Michiel, Miguel Sithium, and several other variants, was a painter from Reval (Tallinn), now capital of Estonia, who was trained in the tradition of Early Netherlandish painting. For most of his life, Sittow worked as a court portrait painter, for Isabella of Castile and her Habsburg relatives in Spain and the Netherlands, and other prominent royal houses. He is considered one of the most important Netherlandish painters of the era.

== Life ==
Michael Sittow was born in 1468 or 1469 in the Hanseatic city of Reval (then part of the Livonian Confederation) to a wealthy family. His father was the painter and wood-carver Clawes (Claves, Claes) Sittow (also van der Sittow, or Suttow) and his mother was Margarethe Mölner. He was the eldest of three brothers, followed by Clawes and Jasper.

The origins of Sittow's father, Clawes (van der) Sittow, are not clear – his patrilinear ancestors may have arrived in Estonia from the village of Zittow near Wismar, Germany; it has also been suggested that he may have been either of local Estonian, German, or even Flemish origin to begin with. It is known that Clawes settled in Reval (Tallinn) in 1454, and became its citizen in 1457. Sittow's father was apparently a wealthy man for an artist, owning several houses in the city, and becoming an assessor in the artists' guild of Reval in 1479. Clawes Sittow married Margarethe Mölner in 1468. Sittow's mother was a Swedish-speaker and daughter of a wealthy merchant Olef Mölner (Olef Andersson Mölnare) from Finland.

At first Sittow studied painting and sculpture in his father's workshop, while attending the city school to learn Latin, arithmetic and singing. After his father's death in 1482, Sittow continued his studies in Bruges in modern Belgium from 1484 to 1488. It is thought that he worked as an apprentice in the leading Netherlandish workshop of the German painter Hans Memling.

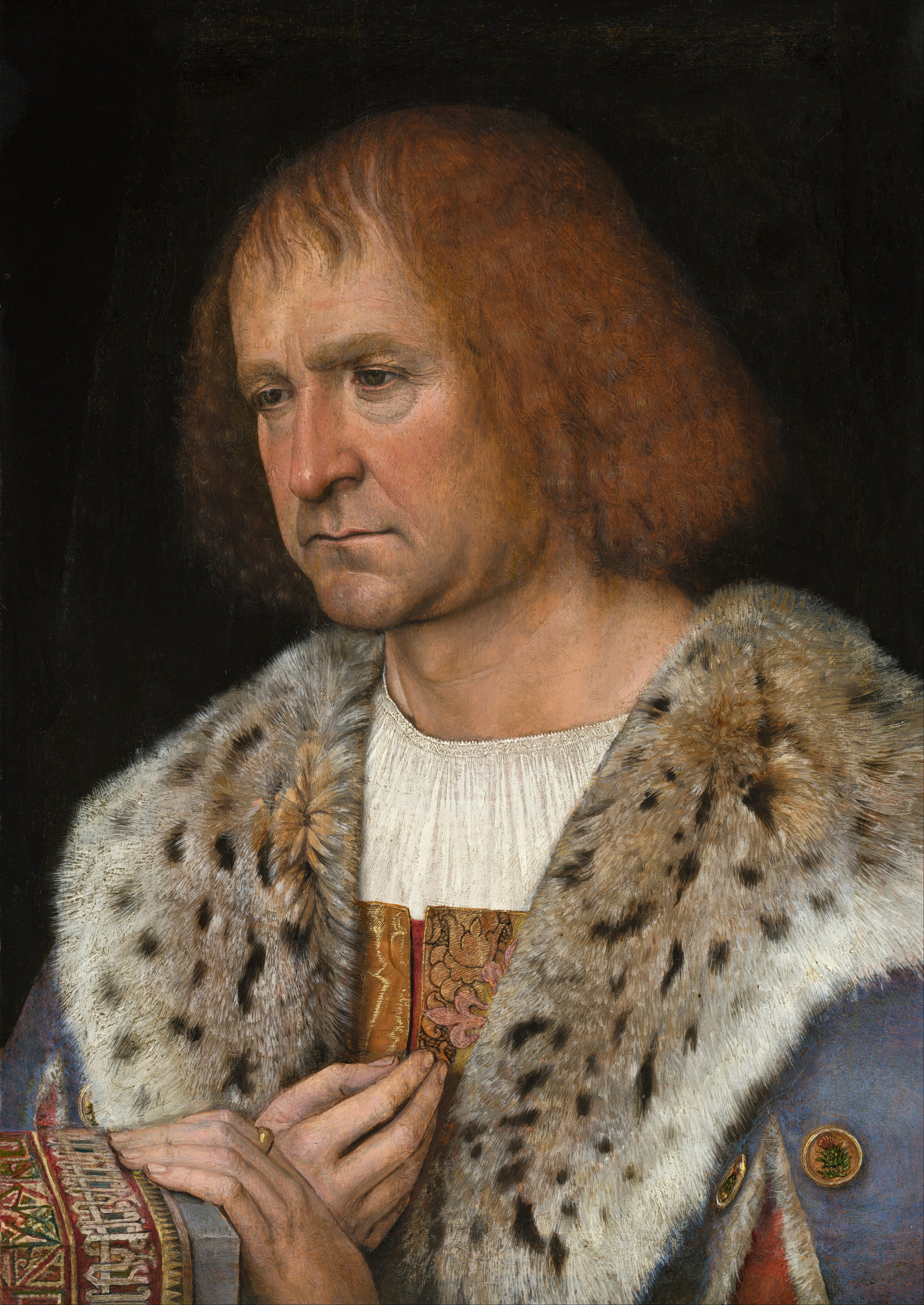
Portrait of Diego de Guevara, c. 1517

Sittow became an independent master between 1488 and 1492, although he did not become a master in the local Bruges guild. Working as a portrait painter, he travelled in southern Europe, as traits of French and Italian art became apparent in his work.

From 1492 Sittow worked in Toledo, Spain for Isabella of Castile as court painter. Isabella assembled academicians and painters from several countries to her court. Sittow became known as Melchior Alemán ("the German") in the court, although letters of Emperor Maximilian and Margaret of Austria speak also of a painter Mychel Flamenco ("Michael the Fleming"), who may have been Michael Sittow. Sittow was the highest-paid painter in the queen's court, receiving a salary of 50,000 maravedis a year (Juan de Flandes, the second highest paid artist, received 20,000 maravedis). Sittow collaborated with Juan de Flandes on the series of small panels of the lives of Christ and the Virgin for the queen.

Officially Sittow worked for Isabella until her death in 1504, although he had left Spain two years before and was presumably working in Flanders for the queen's Habsburg son-in-law Philip the Handsome and daughter-in-law Archduchess Margaret of Austria, painting a portrait of Philibert the Good, Duke of Savoy.

Suggestions that Sittow may have visited London in about 1503–1505 to paint portraits of Henry VII (National Portrait Gallery, London) are no longer accepted.

When Philip died in 1506, Sittow lost his patron again. In the same year, he returned to Reval, where his stepfather, the glass-maker Diderick van Katwijk, had seized his parents' houses, as Sittow's mother had died in 1501. Van Katwijk had journeyed to the Duchy of Brabant in 1501 and offered a property settlement to Sittow that the latter refused. As the local court did not support Sittow's claim for inheritance, he had to go to the Court of Higher Instance in Lübeck. He won the case in Lübeck, but could not officially register his parents' houses as his property until the death of his stepfather in 1518.

In 1507, Sittow joined the Guild of Saint Canute (German: St. Kanutigilde, Estonian: Püha Kanuti gild), the local painters' guild, and married in 1508. Despite being a renowned master in Europe, Sittow was accepted only as a journeyman and was required to paint a masterpiece before becoming a full master craftsman in the guild. Sittow completed various local orders and worked for the St. Peter's Church in Siuntio, Finland.

In 1515, Sittow was again in Spain, this time to claim outstanding debts incurred by Isabella of Castile, and it is significant that in the documentation for his claim he is referred to as pintor criado de madama la prinçesa doña Margarita, that is "painter of the princess Margaret (of Austria)". It seems likely that this was the case at least a year earlier. In 1514, Sittow visited Copenhagen to paint the portrait of Christian II of Denmark. The portrait was part of the diplomacy for the betrothal of Christian II to Margaret's niece Isabella of Austria. The portrait that is held in Copenhagen's Statens Museum for Kunst is probably a copy of a lost original or a second copy ordered from Sittow.

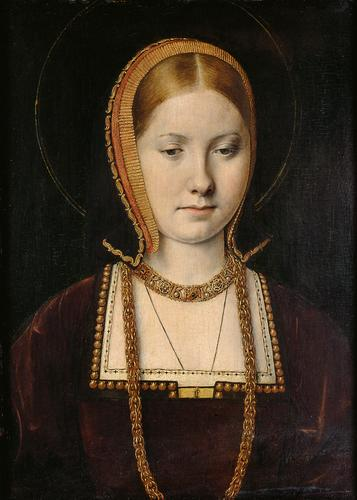
Portrait of a noblewoman, possibly Mary Tudor or Catherine of Aragon,c. 1514, Kunsthistorisches Museum, Vienna

According to some sources, in 1514 Sittow also painted a portrait of Mary Tudor, Queen of France (now in the Vienna Kunsthistorisches Museum), the daughter of Henry VII, as part of the betrothal negotiations. Previously this portrait has been assumed to be of Catherine of Aragon, painted in 1503–1505. Two other Sittow paintings of Mary Magdalen (Detroit) and the Virgin Mary (Berlin) may have also used the same model, or taken the portrait as their starting point – the use of members of royal households as models for sacred figures is found in court art in the Netherlands at this time. The "Berlin Virgin" formed the other half of a diptych with the Washington portrait of Diego de Guevara, a Spanish courtier with the Habsburgs, otherwise best known for giving the Arnolfini Portrait to Archduchess Margaret of Austria, governor of the Spanish Netherlands.

The reidentification of portrait as Mary Rose however does not address other two paintings nor does it go in depth over all the details in the painting itself, which brought criticism over museum's acceptance of the new alleged identity. Author of this reidentification even goes as far as to suggest that Catherine of Aragon had no reason to wear the symbol of scallops as they are not her emblem, the pomegranate is. Not considering the fact that scallops are a symbol of St. James the Great, patron saint of Spain. Notably, pilgrimage to his shrine in Santiago de Compostela was commemorated by wearing scallops, and it is known Catherine of Aragon made this pilgrimage. Credibility of this reidentification is hence questionable.

From the Netherlands, Sittow returned to Spain and worked for Ferdinand II of Aragon, followed in 1516 by the Spanish King Carlos I, the future Charles V, Holy Roman Emperor. When Charles V abdicated from power, he took Sittow's wooden sculpture of the Virgin and three paintings with him to his retirement in the monastery of Yuste. It is possible that Sittow travelled to Spain in an attempt to recover unpaid salary from Queen Isabel of Castile.

In 1516 (possibly 1517 or 1518) Sittow returned to Estonia. In 1518, he married Dorothie, a daughter of a merchant named Allunsze, in Reval. Their son Michel died shortly after birth. In 1523, Sittow became the guildmaster (Aldermann) of the Guild of Saint Canute. Sittow died of the plague in Reval between 20 December 1525 and 20 January 1526. He is buried in the cemetery of the almshouse of the Church of the Holy Spirit (Estonian: Pühavaimu kirik) in Tallinn (Reval).

== Works by Sittow ==
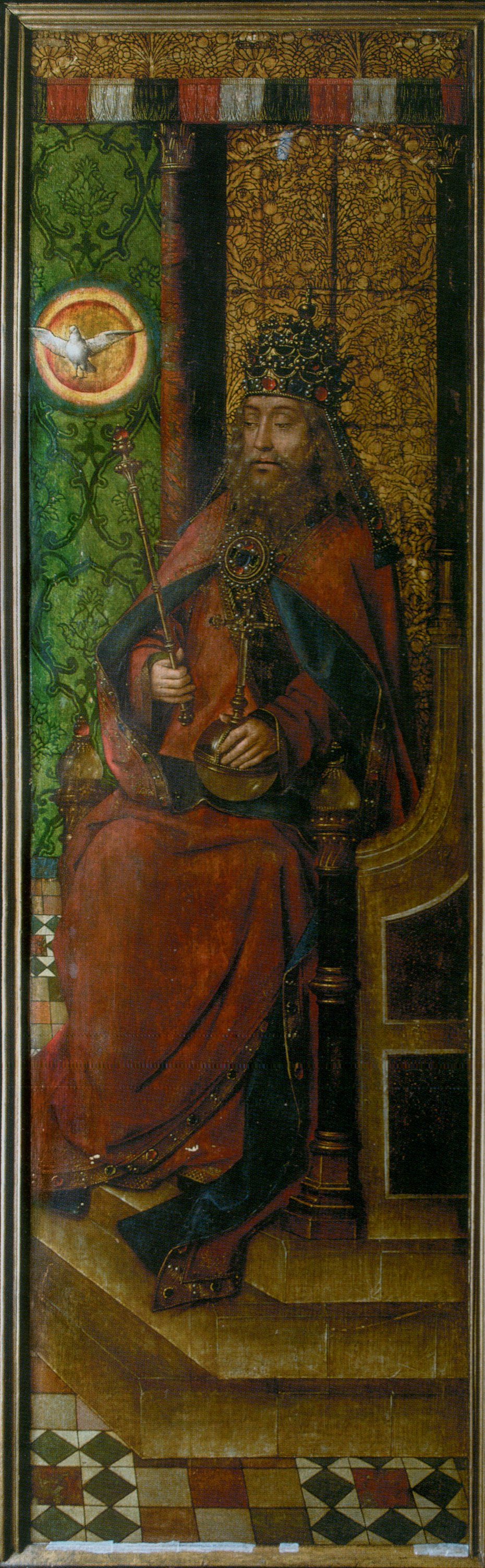
Passion Altarpiece in St. Nicholas' Church, Tallinn

The name of Michael Sittow was nearly unknown for centuries, until in 1914 Max J. Friedländer put forward a hypothesis that Master Michiel, court painter of Queen Isabella, is the author of the diptych discovered near Burgos, depicting the Virgin and Child on one side and a Knight of the Order of Calatrava on the other. In subsequent decades scholars put together a picture of Master Michiel's career in Spain, the Netherlands and in Denmark, but it was not until 1940 that the Estonian-Danish historian Paul Johansen identified the mysterious Master Michiel as Michael Sittow from Reval.

Sittow specialized mainly in small devotional works and portraits, which sometimes project a melancholy mood. His style is heavily influenced by his teacher Hans Memling and also show influence of the elegance found in portraits by Jean Perréal. Sittow used translucent layers of paint to achieve highly refined and subdued color harmonies, combined with light effects and sensitivity to texture. E. P. Richardson described Sittow's work "/../an artist somewhat like Anthony van Dyck in a later epoch; a brilliant painter of religious subjects, but of outstanding qualities as a portrait painter. His portraits are among the finest of their time, vivid, candid, crisply elegant and reserved."

Few surviving paintings can be attributed to Sittow with certainty, and there are many problems of attribution around his work. Though his biography is well documented, the only works that can be attributed to him with certainty are two rather atypical very small panels from a large series mostly by Juan de Flandes for Queen Isabella. The attributions of both the portrait (today in Washington, D.C.) called Don Diego de Guevara (d. Brussels 1520, a nobleman whose family came from Santander in northern Spain; valued member of the Habsburg court in Burgundy), and the painting of the Virgin and Child which together with it once formed a diptych, are nearly certain, as Diego's illegitimate son Felipe de Guevara mentions his father's portrait by Sittow.

Most of Sittow's paintings are not signed and dated – the only painting that can be dated with certainty is the portrait of Christian II of Denmark. There are more than thirty works attributed to Sittow; however, most of them have not been verified by documentation as his.

Many of his paintings (mentioned in various documents) and almost all of his sculptures have not been preserved.

A 2020 paper called "The Apelles Line. Narratives and Synergies in the Late Gothic in Castile" by Olga Pérez Monzón and Matilde Miquel Juan mentions Sittow as one of the artists involved in creating of Retablo de Santiago, ca. 1489–1490, in Capilla de Álvaro de Luna, Catedral Primada de Toledo.

=== List of works ===
- Virgin and Child (left wing of a diptych, possibly Catherine of Aragon), Gemäldegalerie, Berlin, now separated from the other wing, which is the next item
- Portrait of Diego de Guevara (right wing of a diptych), Washington, D.C., The National Gallery of Art
- Virgin and Child (Budapest, Szépművészeti Múzeum)
- Portrait of Christian II, King of Denmark (Copenhagen, Statens Museum for Kunst)
- Portrait of a noblewoman, possibly Mary Tudor or Catherine of Aragon, Vienna, Kunsthistorisches Museum
- Catherine of Aragon as the Magdalene, Detroit Institute of Arts
- Virgin and Child with St. Bernard (Madrid, Museo Lázaro Galdiano)
- Portrait of a Man with a Pearl (Madrid, Royal Collections Gallery)
- Christ Carrying the Cross, Moscow, Pushkin Museum
- Coronation of the Virgin (Paris, Louvre)
- Portrait of a Lady (Paris, Louvre)
- Passion Altarpiece (St. Nicholas' Church, Tallinn)
- Portrait of a Man, The Hague, Mauritshuis
- Nativity, Vienna, Kunsthistorisches Museum, a version of a lost work by Hugo van der Goes
- Assumption of the Virgin (panel from the small altarpiece of Queen Isabella of Castile) Washington, D.C., The National Gallery of Art
- Ascension (panel from the small altarpiece of Queen Isabella of Castile) (Private Collection)
- The Holy Kinship Altarpiece, Bollnäs Church, Bollnäs, Sweden

Among works no longer considered to be by Sittow are:

- Portrait of Henry VII, King of England (National Portrait Gallery (London)), possibly a contemporary copy of a Sittow original.

Among works that have been lost or that have disappeared and are considered to be made by Sittow are:

- Altarpiece in St Peter's Church in Siuntio, Finland. Made in the late 1400s, disappeared or lost by 1633.

== In literature ==
Michael Sittow (as Michel Sittow) is the main character in Jaan Kross' short story Four Monologues on St. George (Estonian: Neli monoloogi Püha Jüri asjus, 1970). The book is written in the form of a judicial inquiry and explores such issues as nationhood, political exile and cultural assimilation. It was awarded the most prestigious short prose award in Estonia, the Friedebert Tuglas Short Story Award.

== Gallery ==
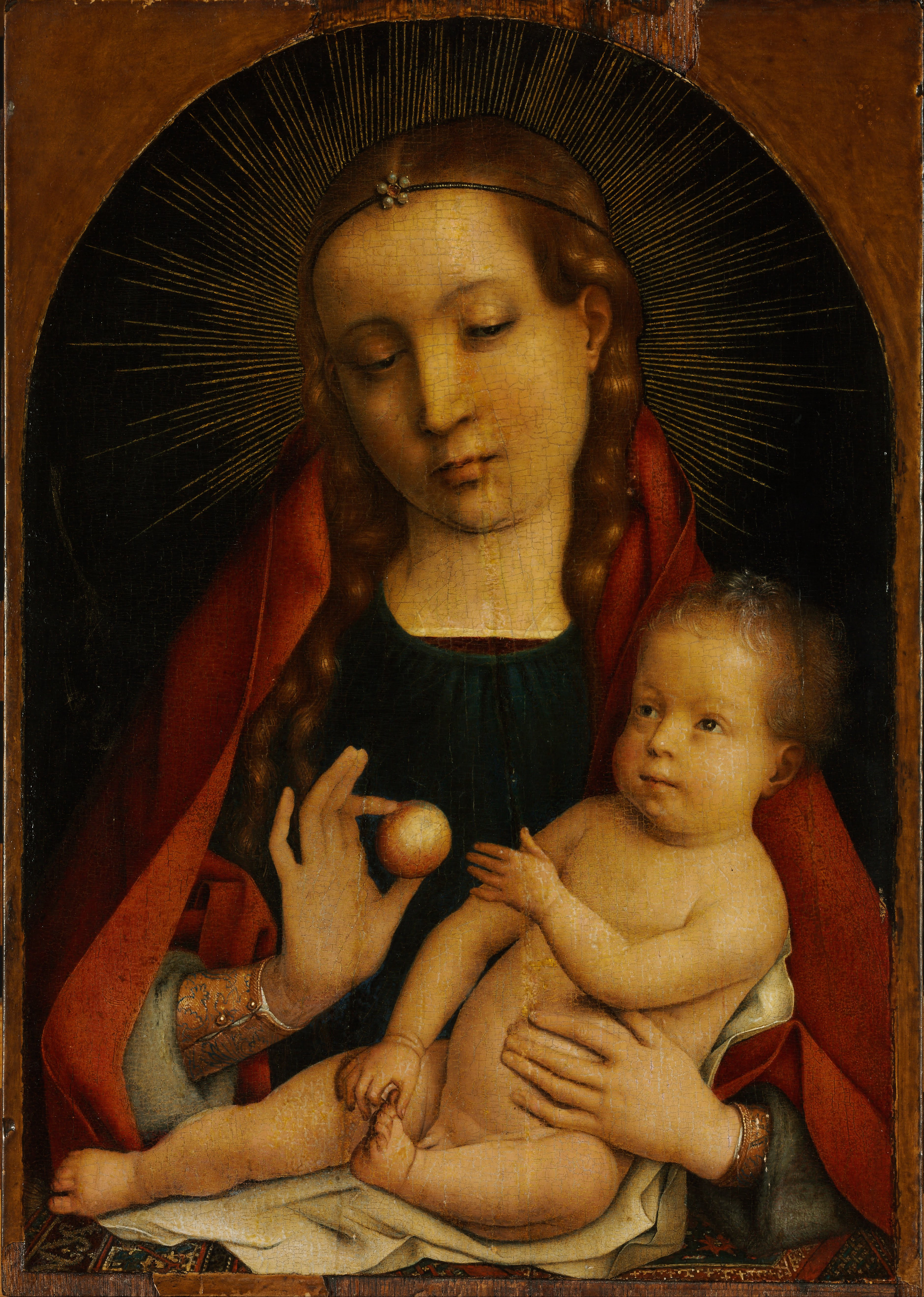
Virgin with Child and Apple, c. 1489, Szépművészeti Múzeum, Budapest

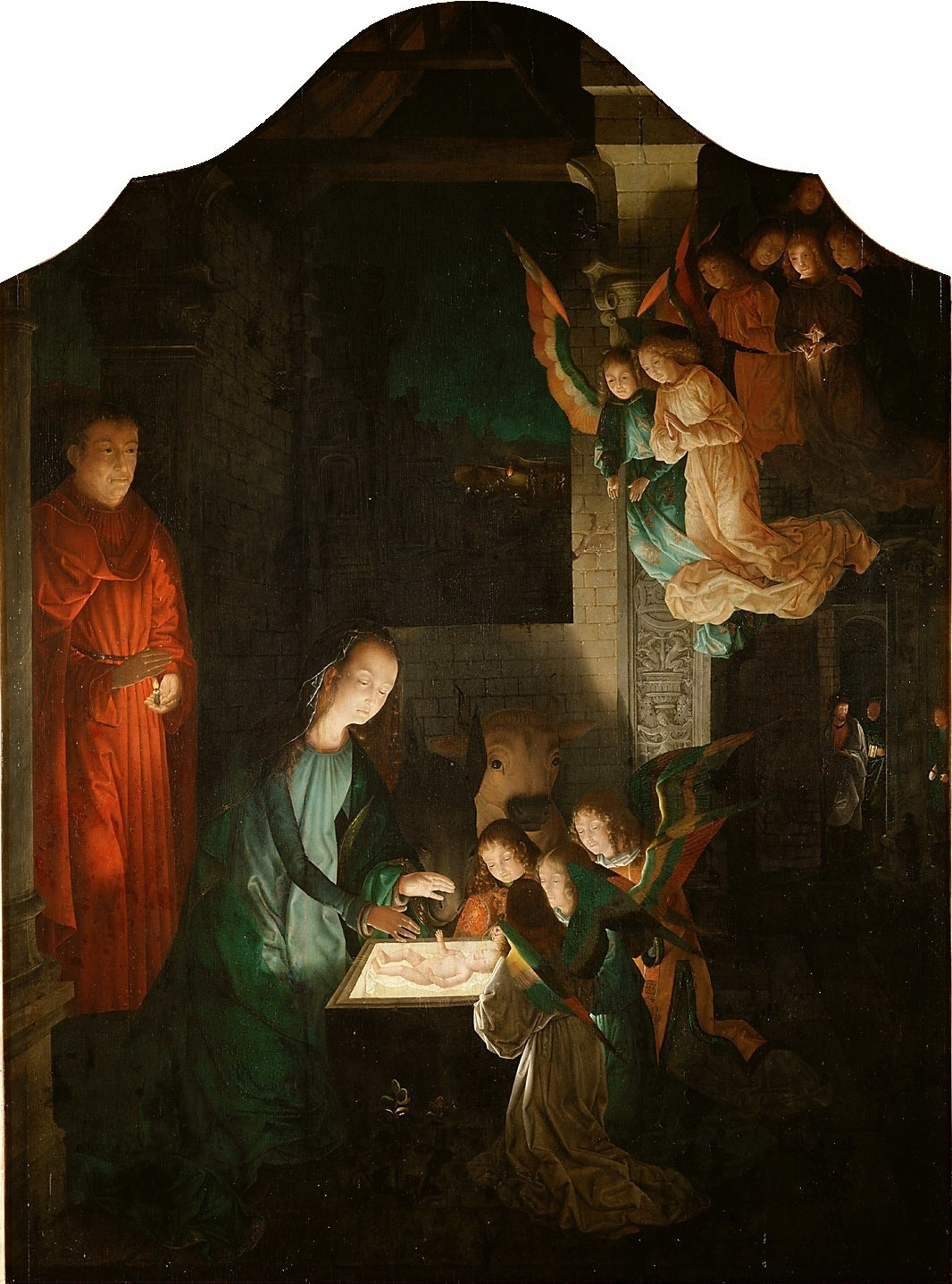
Nativity, c. 1510, Kunsthistorisches Museum, Vienna

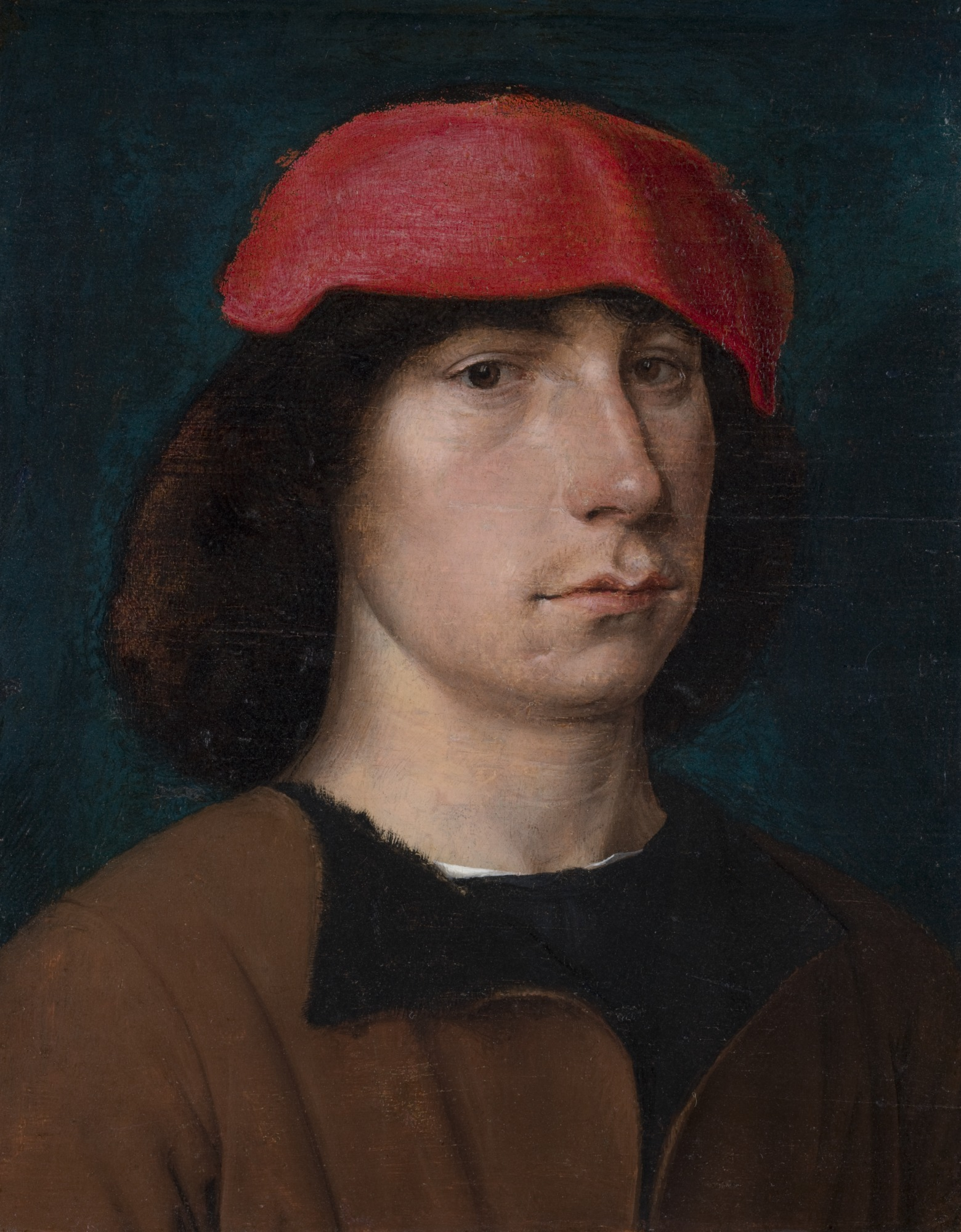
A Young Man in a Red Cap, c. 1512, Detroit Institute of Arts, Michigan.

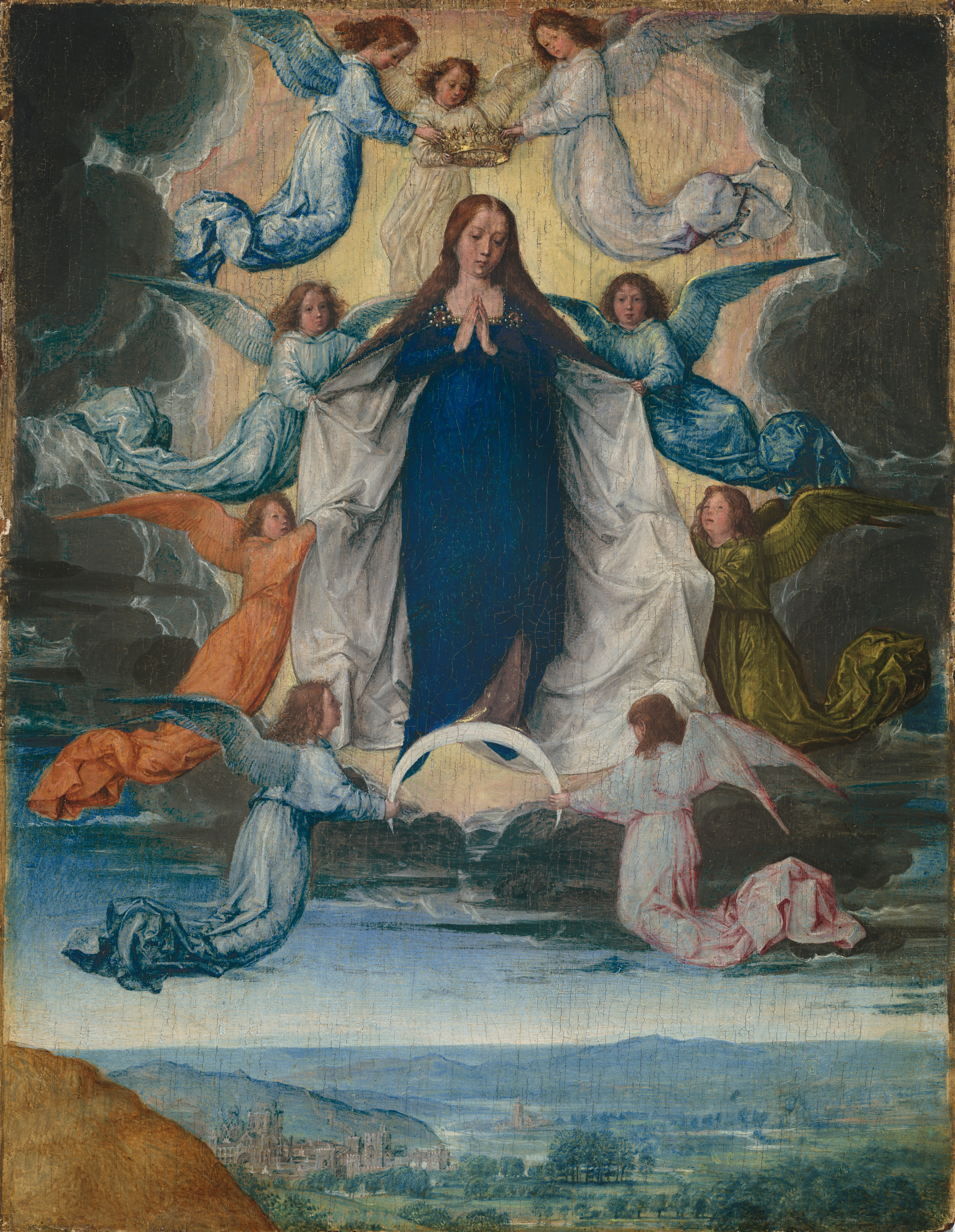
Assumption of the Virgin, c. 1500, National Gallery of Art, Washington D.C.

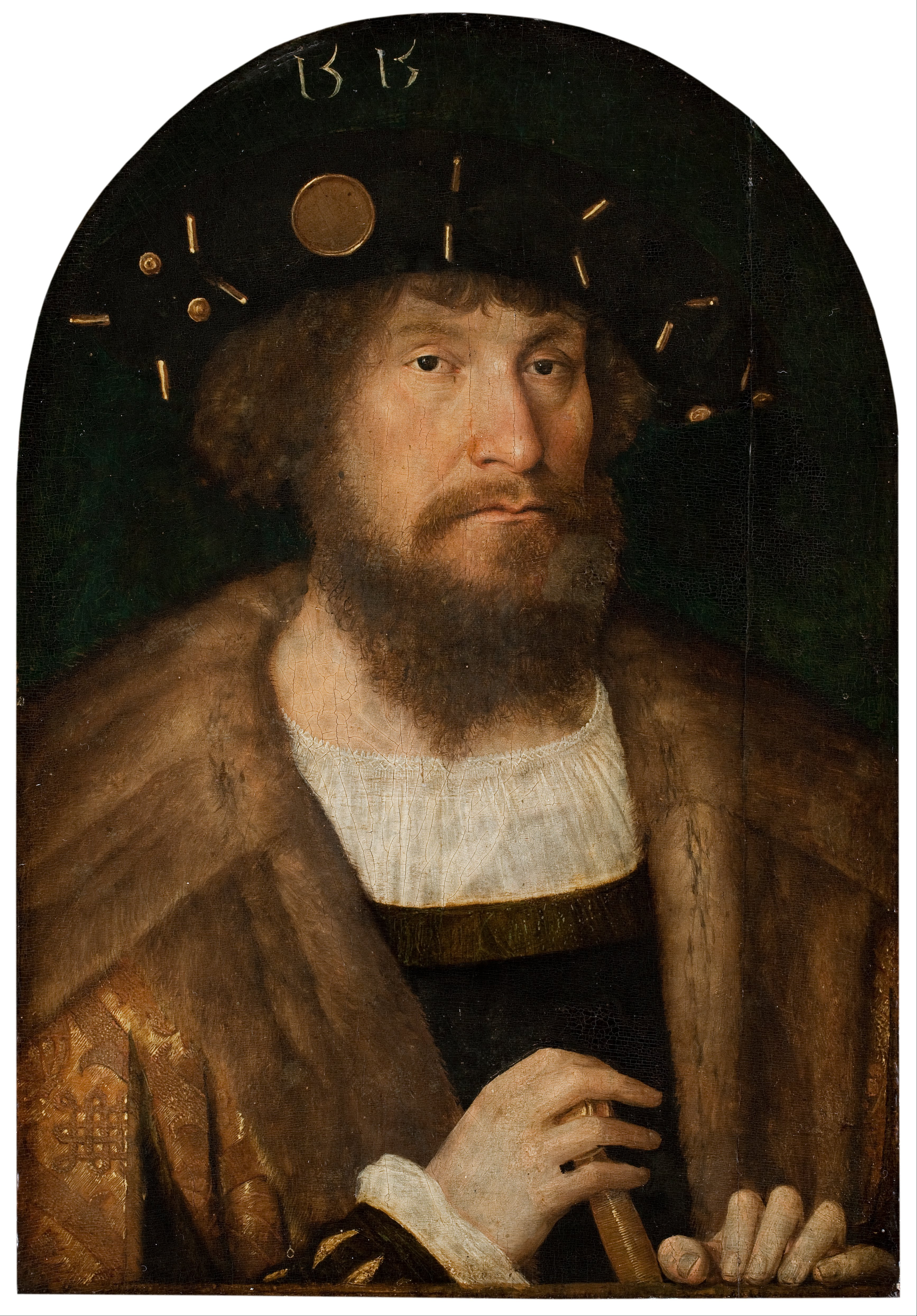
Portrait of Christian II, King of Denmark, c. 1515, Statens Museum for Kunst, Copenhagen

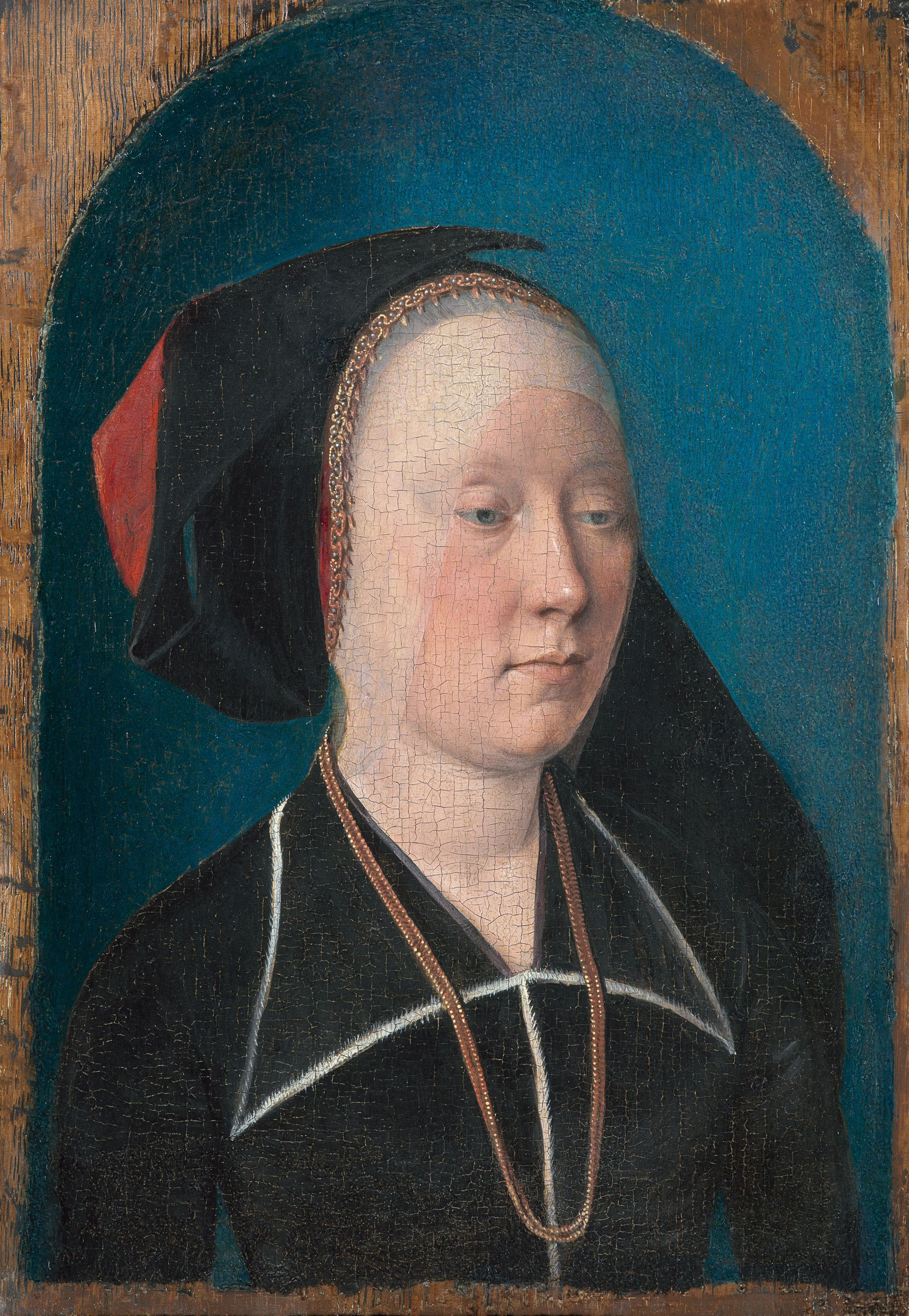
Portrait of a woman, c. 1515, Kunsthistorisches Museum, Vienna

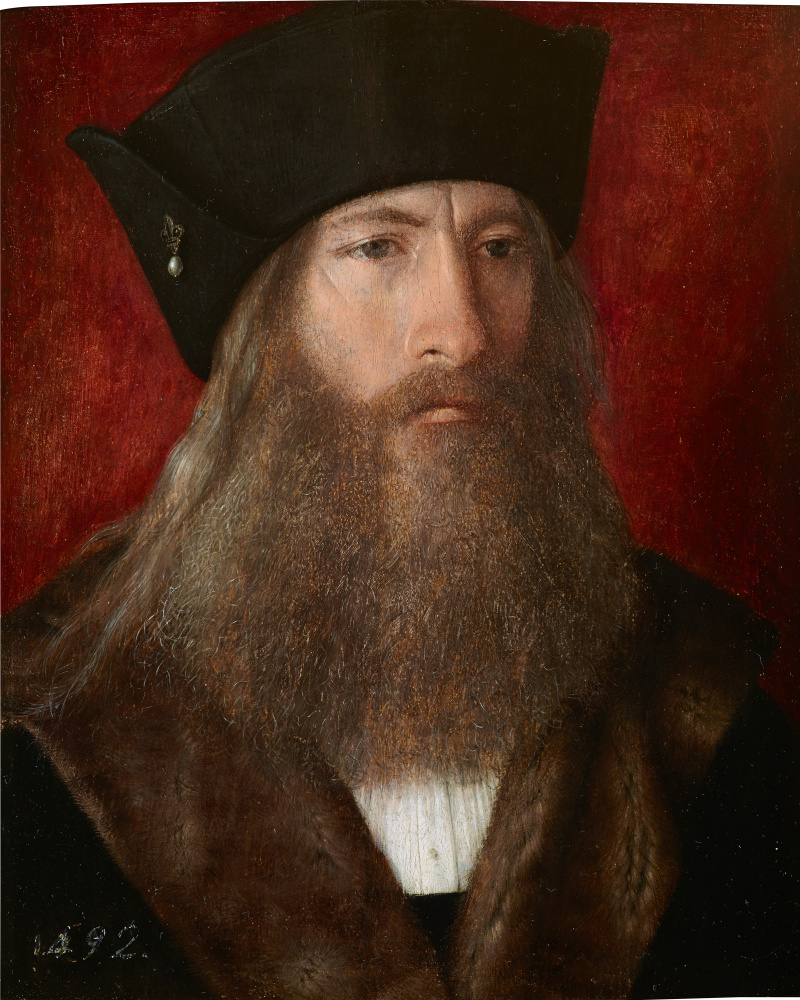
Portrait of a Man with a Pearl, c. 1517, Royal Collections Gallery, Madrid

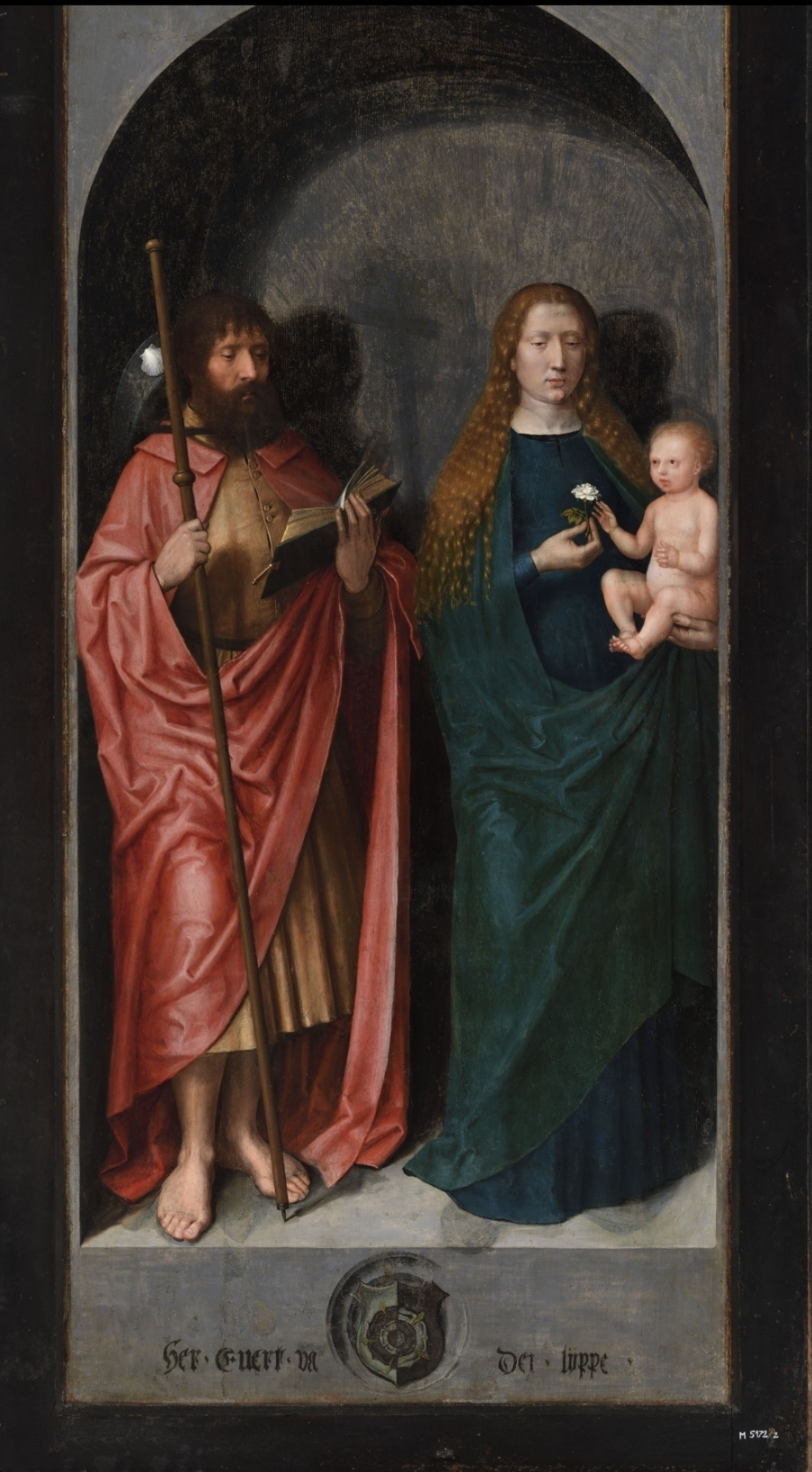
Saint James the Great and the Virgin with Child, c. 1520, Eesti Kunstimuuseum (Niguliste), Tallinn

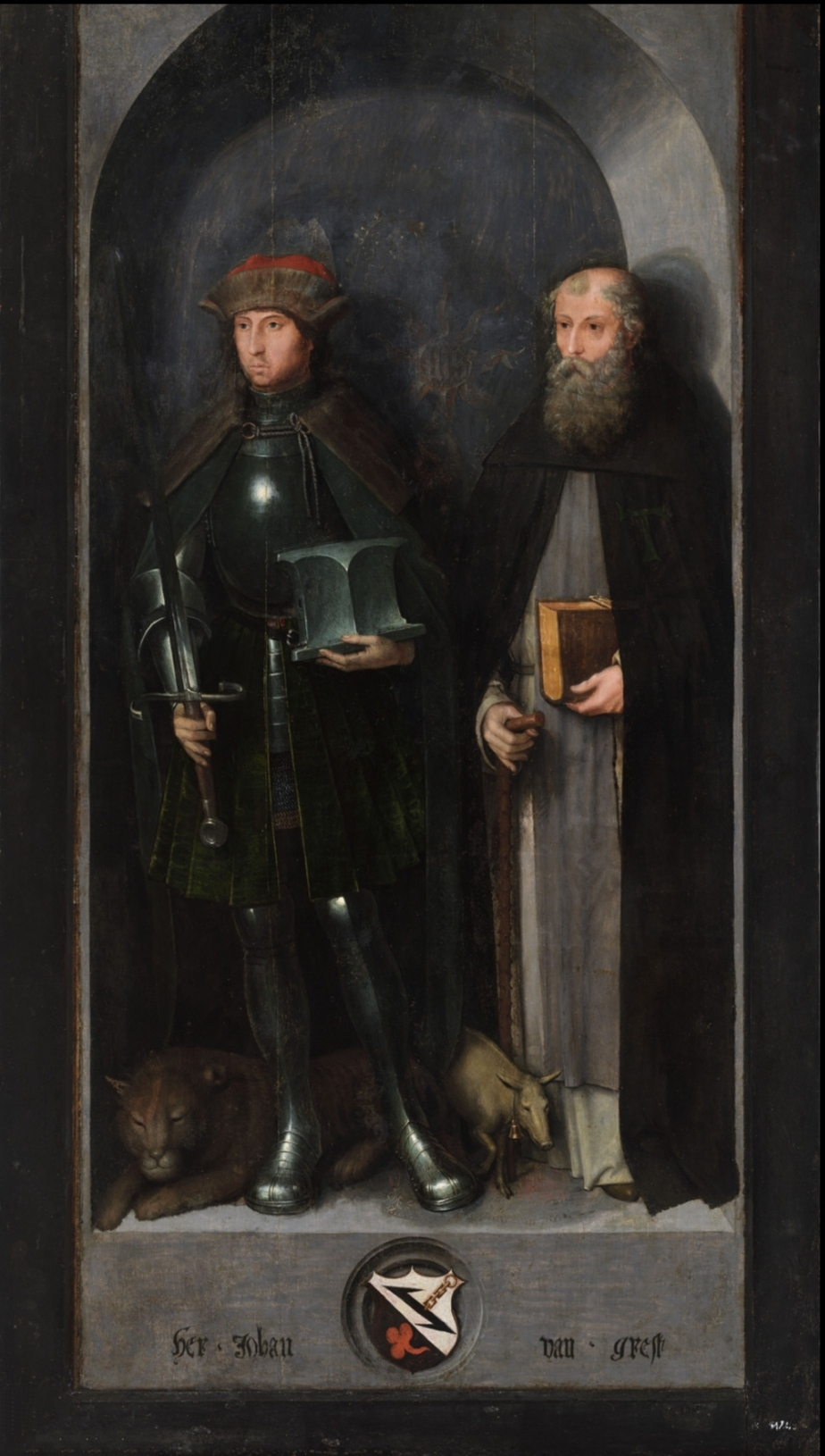
Saint Adrian and Saint Anthony, c. 1520, Eesti Kunstimuuseum (Niguliste), Tallinn

== See also ==
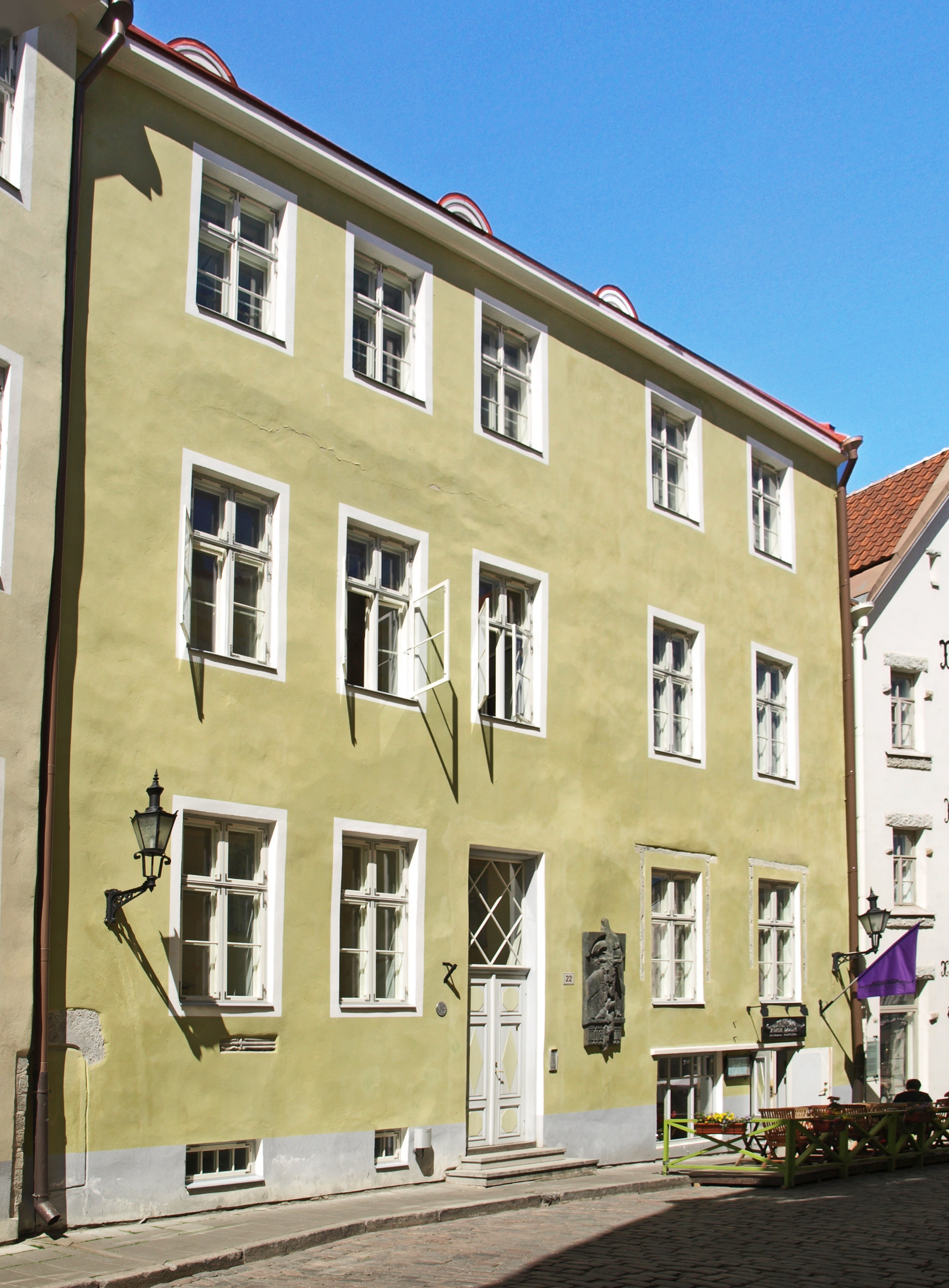
One of the houses in Tallinn that Sittow inherited from his parents. A memorial to Sittow can be found to the right of the door.

- Artists of the Tudor court
- Early Netherlandish painting
- St. Nicholas' Church, Tallinn
