= Arnolfini Portrait =

1434 painting by Jan van Eyck

The Arnolfini Portrait
- Artist: Jan van Eyck
- Year: 1434
- Medium: Oil on oak panel of 3 vertical boards
- Dimensions: 82.2 cm × 60 cm (32.4 in × 23.6 in); panel 84.5 cm × 62.5 cm (33.3 in × 24.6 in)
- Location: National Gallery, London
- Accession: NG186
- Website: nationalgallery.org.uk

The Arnolfini Portrait (or The Arnolfini Wedding, The Arnolfini Marriage, the Portrait of Giovanni Arnolfini and his Wife, or other titles) is an oil painting on oak panel by the Early Netherlandish painter Jan van Eyck, dated 1434 and now in the National Gallery, London. It is a full-length double portrait, believed to depict the Italian merchant Giovanni di Nicolao Arnolfini and his wife, presumably in their residence at the Flemish city of Bruges.

It is considered one of the most original and complex paintings in Western art, because of its beauty, complex iconography, geometric orthogonal perspective, and expansion of the picture space with the use of a mirror. According to Ernst Gombrich:

In its own way it was as new and revolutionary as Donatello's or Masaccio's work in Italy. A simple corner of the real world had suddenly been fixed on to a panel as if by magic [...] For the first time in history the artist became the perfect eye-witness in the truest sense of the term.

The portrait has been considered by Erwin Panofsky and some other art historians as a unique form of marriage contract, recorded as a painting. Signed and dated by van Eyck in 1434, it is, with the Ghent Altarpiece by the same artist and his brother Hubert, the oldest very famous panel painting to have been executed in oils rather than in tempera. The painting was bought by the National Gallery in London in 1842.

Van Eyck used the technique of applying several layers of thin translucent glazes to create a painting with an intensity of both tone and colour. The glowing colours also help to highlight the realism, and to show the material wealth and opulence of Arnolfini's world. Van Eyck took advantage of the longer drying time of oil paint, compared to tempera, to blend colours by painting wet-in-wet to achieve subtle variations in light and shade to heighten the illusion of three-dimensional forms. The wet-in-wet (wet-on-wet) technique, also known as alla prima, was highly utilized by Renaissance painters, including Jan van Eyck. The medium of oil paint also permitted van Eyck to capture surface appearance and distinguish textures precisely. He also rendered the effects of both direct and diffuse light by showing the light from the window on the left reflected by various surfaces. It has been suggested that he used a magnifying glass in order to paint the minute details such as the individual highlights on each of the beads hanging beside the mirror.

The illusionism of the painting was remarkable for its time, in part for the rendering of detail, but particularly for the use of light to evoke space in an interior, for "its utterly convincing depiction of a room, as well of the people who inhabit it". Whatever meaning is given to the scene and its details — and there has been much debate on this — according to Craig Harbison, the painting "is the only fifteenth-century Northern panel to survive in which the artist's contemporaries are shown engaged in some sort of action in a contemporary interior. It is indeed tempting to call this the first genre painting — a painting of everyday life — of modern times".

== Description ==
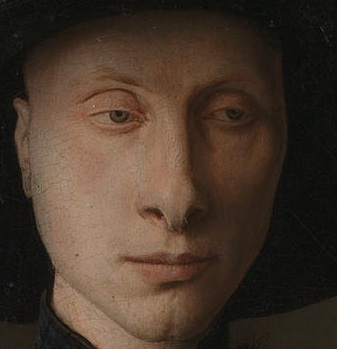
Detail showing the male subject, probably Giovanni di Nicolao Arnolfini.

Jan van Eyck's characteristic Early Netherlandish style depicts the scene with a high level of detail. The painting is generally in very good condition, though with small losses of original paint and damage, which have mostly been retouched. Infrared reflectograms of the painting show many small alterations, or pentimenti, in the underdrawing: to both faces, to the mirror, and to other elements. The couple is shown in an upstairs room with a chest and a bed in it during early summer, as indicated by the fruits on the cherry tree outside the window. The room probably functioned as a reception room, as was the fashion in France and Burgundy, where beds in reception rooms were used for seating — except, for example, when a mother with a new baby received visitors. The window has six interior wooden shutters, but only the top opening has glass, with clear bulls-eye pieces set in blue, red, and green stained glass.

The two figures are very richly dressed; despite the season, both their outer garments, his tabard and her houppelande, are trimmed and fully lined with fur. The furs may be the especially expensive sable for him and ermine or miniver for her. He wears a hat of plaited straw dyed black, as was often worn in summer at this time. His tabard was more purple than it appears now (as the pigments have faded over time) and may be intended to be silk velvet (another very expensive item). Underneath, he wears a doublet of patterned material, probably silk damask. The woman holds her long, full skirts up, revealing a blue underdress also trimmed with white fur. Her robe has elaborate dagging (cloth folded and sewn together, then cut and frayed decoratively) on the sleeves, and a long train. The gown is pleated by a belt.

Although the woman's plain gold necklace and the rings that both wear are the only jewellery visible, both outfits would have been enormously expensive, and appreciated as such by a contemporary viewer. There may be an element of restraint in their clothes (especially the man) befitting their merchant status — portraits of aristocrats tend to show gold chains and more decorated cloth, although "the restrained colours of the man's clothing correspond to those favoured by Duke Philip of Burgundy".

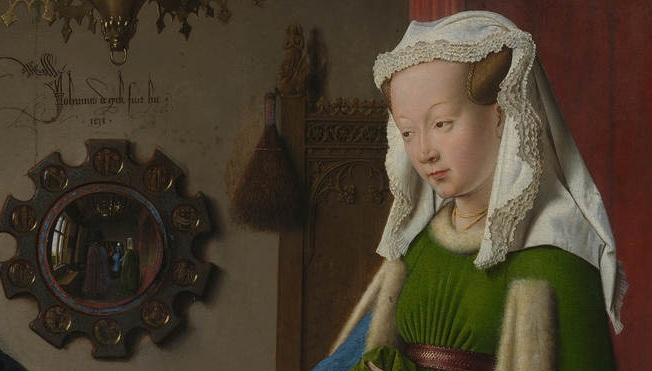
Detail showing the female subject and convex mirror.

The interior of the room has other signs of wealth: the brass chandelier is large and elaborate by contemporary standards and would have been very expensive. It would probably have had a mechanism with pulley and chains above, to lower it for managing the candles (possibly omitted from the painting for lack of room). The convex mirror at the back, in a wooden frame with scenes of The Passion painted behind glass, is shown larger than such mirrors could actually be made at this date — another discreet departure from realism by van Eyck. There is also no sign of a fireplace (including in the mirror), nor anywhere obvious to put one. Even the oranges casually placed to the left are a sign of wealth; they were very expensive in Burgundy, and may have been one of the goods in which Arnolfini dealt. Further signs of luxury are the elaborate bed-hangings and the carvings on the chair and bench against the back wall (to the right, partly hidden by the bed), also the small Oriental carpet on the floor by the bed. Many owners of such expensive objects placed them on tables, as they still do in the Netherlands. There existed a friendship between Giovanni Arnolfini and Philip the Good, who sent his court painter Jan van Eyck to portray Arnolfini Double. The relation possibly began with a tapestry order, including the images of Notre Dame Cathedral in return of a good payment.

The view in the mirror shows two figures just inside the door that the couple are facing. The second figure, wearing red, is presumably the artist — although, unlike Velázquez in Las Meninas, he does not seem to be painting. Scholars have made this assumption based on the appearance of figures wearing red head-dresses in some other van Eyck works (e.g., the Portrait of a Man (Self Portrait?) and the figure in the background of the Madonna with Chancellor Rolin). The dog is an early form of the breed now known as the Affenpinscher.

The painting is signed, inscribed, and dated on the wall above the mirror: "Johannes de eyck fuit hic 1434" ("Jan van Eyck was here 1434"). The inscription looks as if it were painted in large letters on the wall, as was done with proverbs and other phrases of this period. Other surviving van Eyck signatures are painted in trompe-l'œil on the wooden frame of his paintings, so that they appear to have been carved in the wood.

== Identity of subjects ==
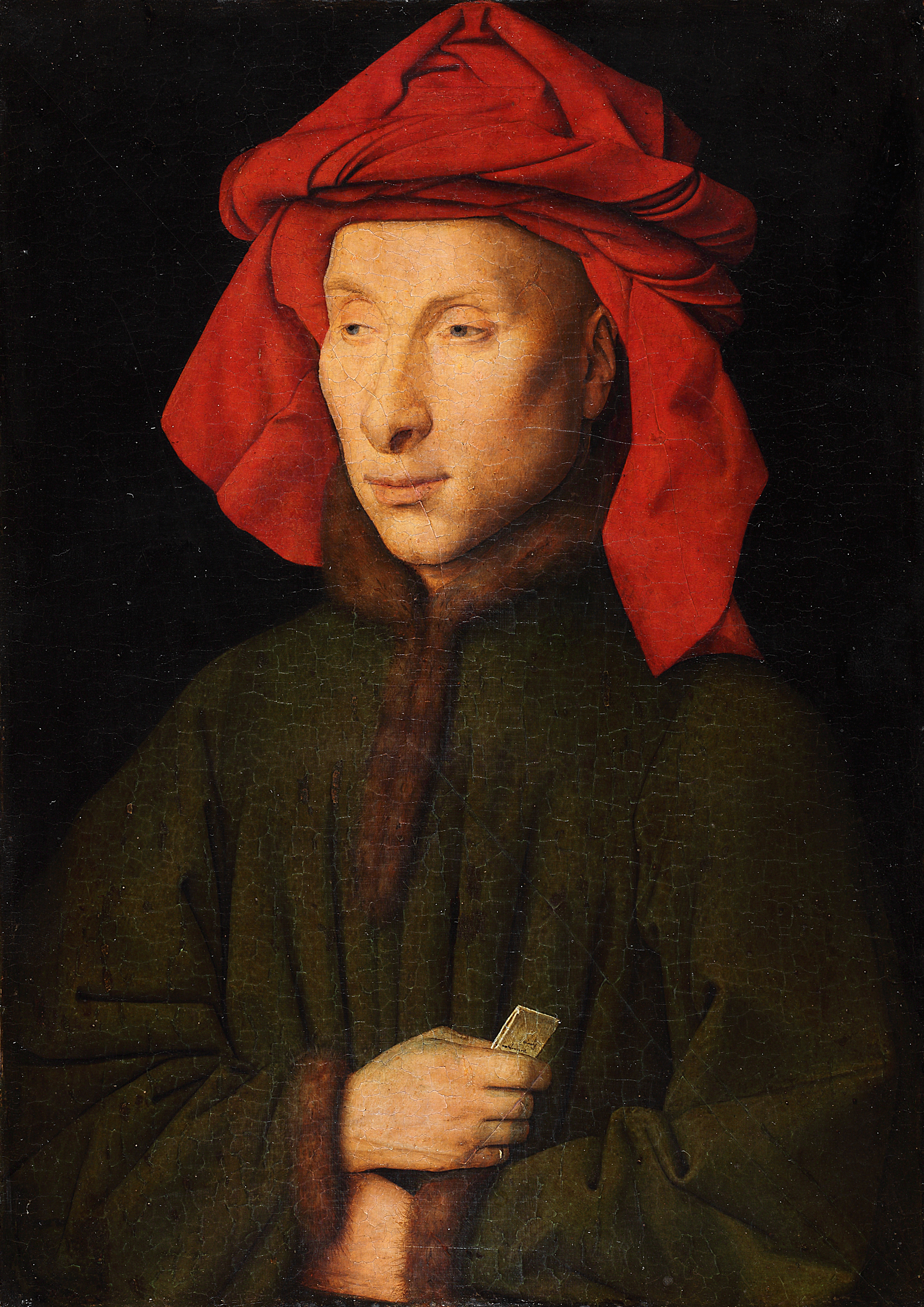
Jan van Eyck, Portrait of Giovanni di Nicolao Arnolfini. Gemäldegalerie, Berlin.

In their book published in 1857, Crowe and Cavalcaselle were the first to link the double portrait with the early 16th century inventories of Margaret of Austria. They suggested that the painting shows portraits of Giovanni [di Arrigo] Arnolfini and his wife. Four years later, James Weale published a book in which he agreed with this analysis and identified Giovanni's wife as Jeanne (or Giovanna) Cenami. For the next century, most art historians accepted that the painting was a double portrait of Giovanni di Arrigo Arnolfini and his wife Jeanne Cenami, but a chance discovery published in 1997 established that they were married in 1447, thirteen years after the date on the painting and six years after van Eyck's death.

It is now believed that the subject is either Giovanni di Arrigo or his cousin, Giovanni di Nicolao Arnolfini, and a wife of either one of them. This is either an undocumented first wife of Giovanni di Arrigo or a second wife of Giovanni di Nicolao, or, according to a recent proposal, Giovanni di Nicolao's first wife, Costanza Trenta, who had died perhaps in childbirth by February 1433. In the latter case, this would make the painting partly an unusual memorial portrait, showing one living and one dead person. Details such as the snuffed-out candle above the woman, the scenes after Christ's death on her side of the background roundel, and the black garb of the man, support this view. Both Giovanni di Arrigo and Giovanni di Nicolao Arnolfini were Italian merchants, originally from Lucca, but resided in Bruges since at least 1419. The man in this painting is the subject of a further portrait by van Eyck in the Gemäldegalerie, Berlin, leading to speculation he was a friend of the artist.

== Scholarly debate ==
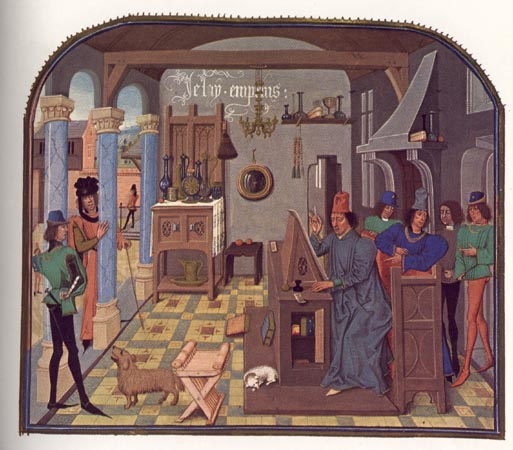
Charles the Bold surprising David Aubert, a miniature with an unusual variant of the presentation portrait, probably alluding to Alexander the Great, who surprised one of his artists in similar fashion. The rear wall seems to refer to the Arnolfini Portrait of forty years earlier, containing many of the same objects like the convex mirror and in particular the painted inscription on the wall. Loyset Liédet, before 1472.

In 1934, Erwin Panofsky published an article entitled Jan van Eyck's 'Arnolfini' Portrait in the Burlington Magazine, arguing that the elaborate signature on the back wall, and other factors, shows that it was painted as a legal record of the occasion of the marriage of the couple, complete with witnesses and a witness signature. Panofsky also argues that the many details of domestic items in the painting each have a disguised symbolism attached to their appearance. While Panofsky's claim that the painting formed a kind of certificate of marriage is not accepted by all art historians, his analysis of the symbolic function of the details is broadly agreed, and has been applied to many other Early Netherlandish paintings, especially a number of depictions of the Annunciation set in richly detailed interiors — a tradition for which the Arnolfini Portrait and the Mérode Altarpiece by Robert Campin represent the start (in terms of surviving works at least).

Since then, there has been considerable scholarly argument among art historians on the occasion represented. Edwin Hall considers that the painting depicts a betrothal, not a marriage. Margaret D. Carroll argues that the painting is a portrait of a married couple that alludes also to the husband's grant of legal authority to his wife. Carroll also proposes that the portrait was meant to affirm Giovanni Arnolfini's good character as a merchant and aspiring member of the Burgundian court. She argues that the painting depicts a couple, already married, now formalizing a subsequent legal arrangement, a mandate, by which the husband "hands over" to his wife the legal authority to conduct business on her own or his behalf (similar to a power of attorney). The claim is not that the painting had any legal force, but that van Eyck played upon the imagery of legal contract as a pictorial conceit. While the two figures in the mirror could be thought of as witnesses to the oath-taking, the artist himself provides (witty) authentication with his notarial signature on the wall.

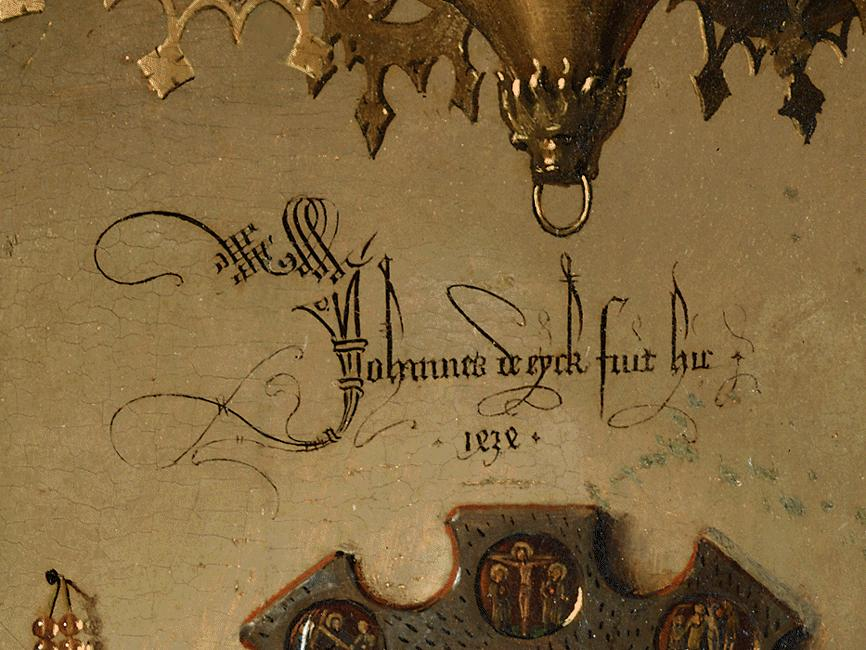
Johannes de eyck fuit hic 1434 (Jan van Eyck was here. 1434).

In his 1986 article "The reality of symbols: the question of disguised symbolism in Jan van Eyck's Arnolfini Portrait", Jan Baptist Bedaux agrees somewhat with Panofsky that this is a marriage contract portrait. However, he disagrees with Panofsky's idea of items in the portrait having hidden meanings. Bedaux argues, "If the symbols are disguised to such an extent that they do not clash with reality as conceived at the time...there will be no means of proving that the painter actually intended such symbolism." He also conjectures that if these disguised symbols were normal parts of the marriage ritual, then one could not say for sure whether the items were part of a "disguised symbolism" or just social reality.

Craig Harbison takes the middle ground between Panofsky and Bedaux in their debate about "disguised symbolism" and realism. Harbison argues that "Jan van Eyck is there as storyteller...[who] must have been able to understand that, within the context of people's lives, objects could have multiple associations", and that there are many possible purposes for the portrait and ways it can be interpreted. He maintains that this portrait cannot be fully interpreted until scholars accept the notion that objects can have multiple associations. Harbison urges the notion that one needs to conduct a multivalent reading of the painting that includes references to the secular and sexual context of the Burgundian court, as well as religious and sacramental references to marriage.

Lorne Campbell, in the National Gallery Catalogue, sees no need to find a special meaning in the painting: "... there seems little reason to believe that the portrait has any significant narrative content. Only the unnecessary lighted candle and the strange signature provoke speculation." He suggests that the double portrait was very possibly made to commemorate a marriage, but not a legal record, and cites examples of miniatures from manuscripts showing similarly elaborate inscriptions on walls as a normal form of decoration at the time. Another portrait in the National Gallery by van Eyck, Portrait of a Man (Leal Souvenir), has a legalistic form of signature.

Margaret Koster's new suggestion (discussed above and below) that the portrait is a memorial one, of a wife already dead for a year or so, would displace these theories. Art historian Maximiliaan Martens has suggested that the painting was meant as a gift for the Arnolfini family in Italy. It had the purpose of showing the prosperity and wealth of the couple depicted. He feels this might explain oddities in the painting, for example, why the couple are standing in typical winter clothing while a cherry tree is in fruit outside, and why the phrase "Johannes de eyck fuit hic 1434" is featured so large in the centre of the painting. Herman Colenbrander has proposed that the painting may depict an old German custom of a husband promising a gift to his bride on the morning after their wedding night. He has also suggested that the painting may have been a present from the artist to his friend.

In 2016, French physician Jean-Philippe Postel, in his book L'Affaire Arnolfini, agreed with Koster that the woman is dead, but he suggested that she is appearing to the man as a spectre, asking him to pray for her soul.

== Interpretation and symbolism ==
=== Figures and marriage ===
It is thought that the couple are already married because of the woman's headdress. A non-married woman would have her hair down, according to Margaret Carroll. The placement of the two figures suggests conventional 15th century views of marriage and gender roles: the woman stands near the bed and well into the room, symbolic of her role as the caretaker of the house and solidifying her in a domestic role, whereas Giovanni stands near the open window, symbolic of his role in the outside world. Arnolfini looks directly out at the viewer; his wife gazes obediently at her husband. His hand is vertically raised, representing his commanding position of authority, whilst she has her hand in a lower, horizontal, more submissive pose. However, her gaze at her husband can also show her equality to him because she is not looking down at the floor as lower-class women would. They are part of the Burgundian court life and in that system she is his equal, not his lowly subordinate.

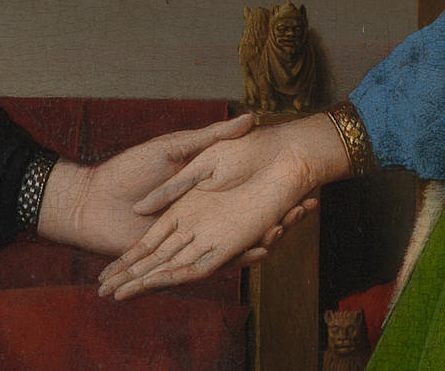
Detail showing the couple's joined hands.

The symbolism behind the action of the couple's joined hands has also been debated among scholars. Many point to this gesture as proof of the painting's purpose. Is it a marriage contract or something else? Panofsky interprets the gesture as an act of fides, Latin for "marital oath". He calls the representation of the couple "qui desponsari videbantur per fidem", which means, "who were contracting their marriage by marital oath". The man is grasping the woman's right hand with his left, which is the basis for the controversy. Some scholars like Jan Baptist Bedaux and Peter Schabacker argue that if this painting does show a marriage ceremony, then the use of the left hand points to the marriage being morganatic and not clandestine. A marriage is said to be morganatic if a man marries a woman of unequal rank. However, the subjects originally thought by most scholars to be represented in this painting, Giovanni Arnolfini and Giovanna Cenami, were of equal status and rank in the courtly system, so the theory would not hold true. On the opposite side of the debate are scholars like Margaret Carroll. She suggests that the painting deploys the imagery of a contract between an already married couple giving the wife the authority to act on her husband's behalf in business dealings. Carroll identifies Arnolfini's raised right hand as a gesture of oath-taking known as "fidem levare", and his joining hands with his wife as a gesture of consent known as "fides manualis".

Although many viewers assume the wife to be pregnant, this is not believed to be so. Art historians point to numerous paintings of female virgin saints similarly dressed, and believe that this look was fashionable for women's dresses at the time. Fashion would have been important to Arnolfini, especially since he was a cloth merchant. The more cloth a person wore, the more wealthy he or she was assumed to be. Another indication that the woman is not pregnant is that Giovanna Cenami (the identification of the woman according to most earlier scholars) died childless, as did Costanza Trenta (a possible identification according to recent archival evidence); whether a hypothetical unsuccessful pregnancy would have been left recorded in a portrait is questionable, although if it is indeed Costanza Trenta, as Koster proposed, and she died in childbirth, then the oblique reference to pregnancy gains strength. Moreover, the beauty ideal embodied in contemporary female portraits and clothing rest in the first place on the high valuation on the ability of women to bear children. Harbison maintains that her gesture is merely an indication of the extreme desire of the couple shown for fertility and progeny.

There is a carved figure as a finial on the bedpost, probably of Saint Margaret, patron saint of pregnancy and childbirth, who was invoked to assist women in labor and to cure infertility, or possibly representing Saint Martha, the patroness of housewives. From the bedpost hangs a brush, symbolic of domestic duties. Furthermore, the brush and the prayer beads (a popular engagement present from the future bridegroom) appearing together on either side of the mirror may also allude to the dual Christian injunctions ora et labora (pray and work). According to Jan Baptist Bedaux, the broom could also symbolize proverbial chastity; it "sweeps out impurities".

=== Mirror ===
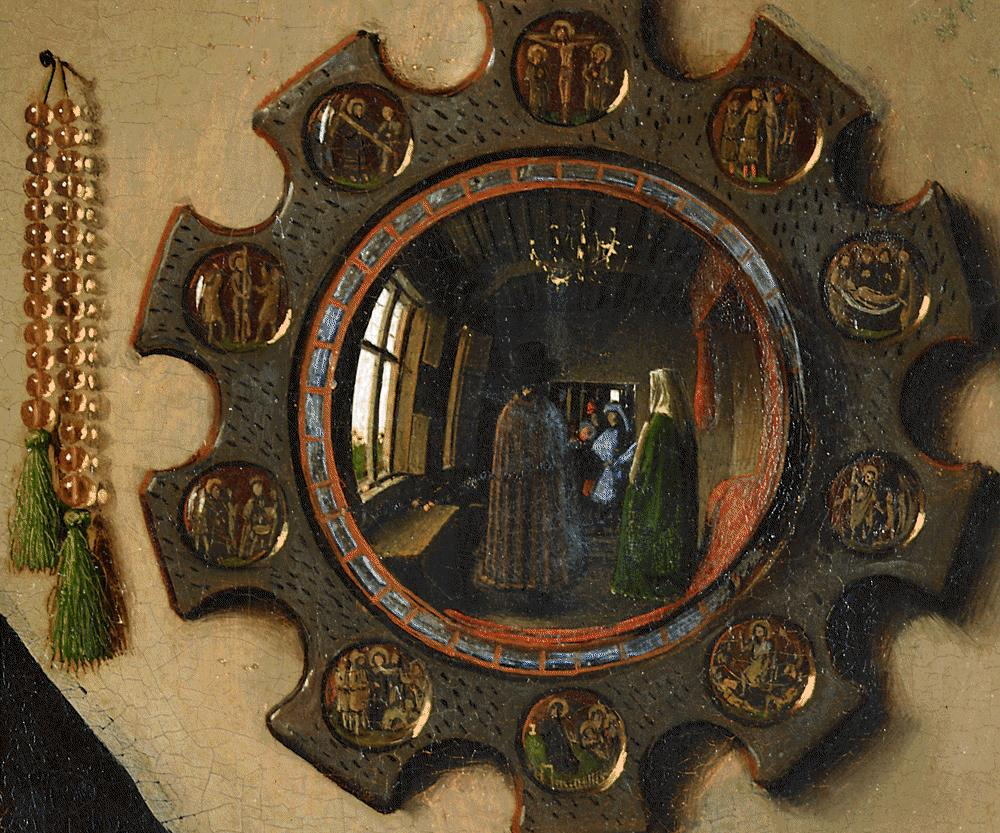
Detail of the convex mirror.

The small medallions set into the frame of the convex mirror at the back of the room show tiny scenes from the Passion of Christ and may represent God's promise of salvation for the figures reflected on the mirror's convex surface. Furthering the Memorial theory, all the scenes on the wife's side are of Christ's death and resurrection. Those on the husband's side concern Christ's life. The mirror itself may represent the eye of God observing the wedding vows. A spotless mirror was also an established symbol of Mary, referring to the Holy Virgin's Immaculate Conception and purity. The mirror reflects two figures in the doorway, one of whom may be the painter himself. In Panofsky's controversial view, the figures are shown to prove that the two witnesses required to make a wedding legal were present, and Van Eyck's signature on the wall acts as some form of actual documentation of an event at which he himself was present.

According to one author, "The painting is often referenced for its immaculate depiction of non-Euclidean geometry", referring to the image as seen in the convex mirror. Assuming a spherical mirror, the distortion has been correctly portrayed, except for the leftmost part of the window frame, the near edge of the table, and the hem of the dress.

=== Other objects ===
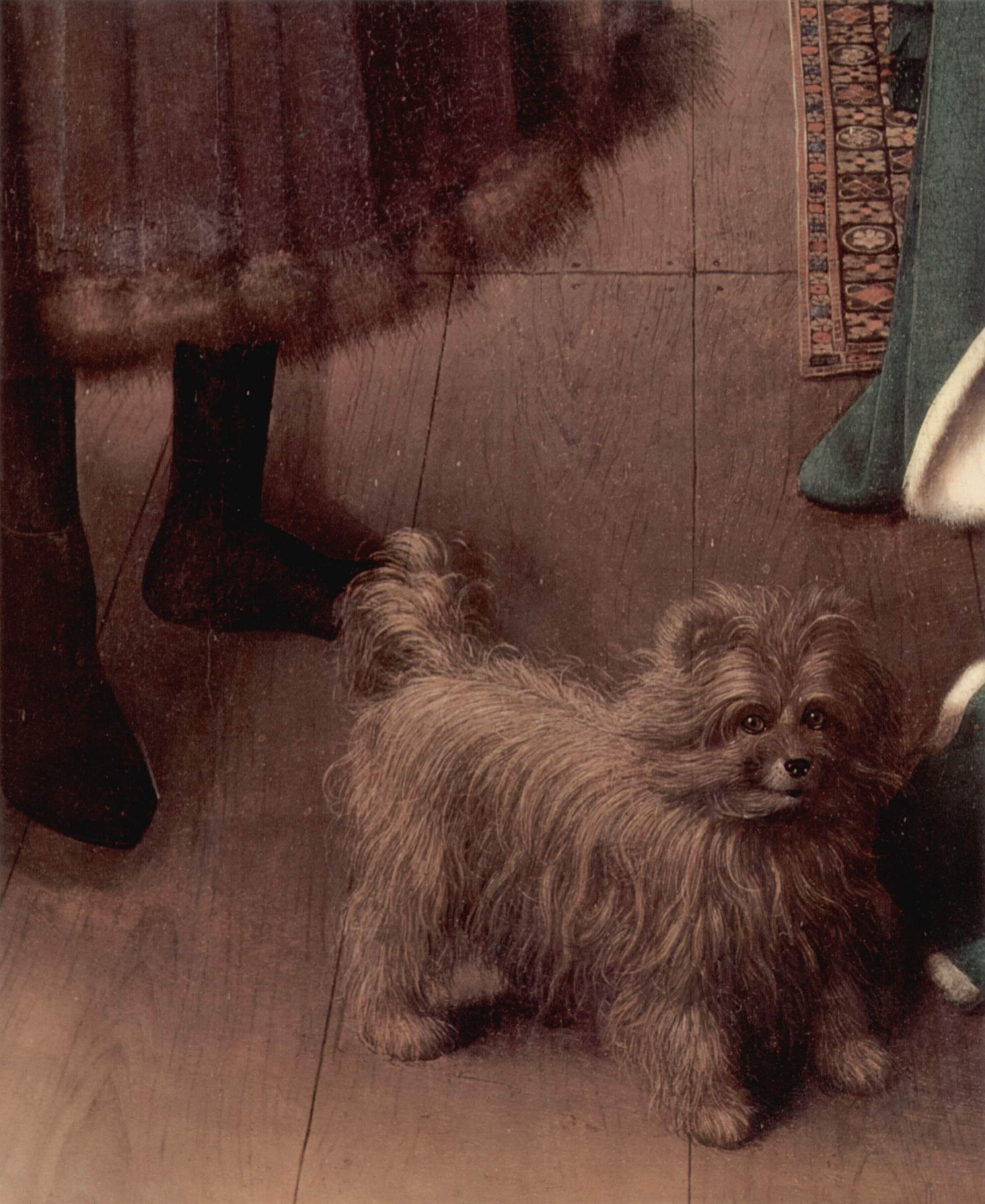
Detail of the dog

The little dog may symbolize fidelity (fido), loyalty, or alternatively lust, signifying the couple's desire to have a child. Unlike the couple, he looks out to meet the gaze of the viewer. The dog could be simply a lap dog, a gift from husband to wife. Many wealthy women in the court had lap dogs as companions, reflecting the wealth of the couple and their position in courtly life. The dog appears to be a Griffon terrier, or perhaps an Affenpinscher.

The green of the woman's dress symbolizes hope, possibly the hope of becoming a mother. Its intense brightness also indicates wealth, since dyeing fabric such a shade was difficult and expensive. Her white cap could signify purity or her status as married. Behind the pair, the curtains of the marriage bed have been opened; the red curtains might allude to the physical act of love.

The single candle in the left-front holder of the ornate six-branched chandelier is possibly the candle used in traditional Flemish marriage customs. Lit in full daylight, like the sanctuary lamp in a church, the candle may allude to the presence of the Holy Ghost or the ever-present eye of God. Alternatively, Margaret Koster posits that the painting is a memorial portrait, as the single lit candle on Giovanni's side contrasts with the burnt-out candle whose wax stub can just be seen on his wife's side, in a visual play on a common metaphor: he lives on, she is dead.

The cherries present on the tree outside the window may symbolize love. The oranges which lie on the windowsill and chest may symbolize the purity and innocence that reigned in the Garden of Eden before the Fall of Man. They were uncommon and a sign of wealth in the Netherlands, but in Italy were a symbol of fecundity in marriage. More simply, the fruit could be a sign of the couple's wealth, since oranges were very expensive imports.

The male subject's overshoes, called pattens, were a covering for indoor footwear that were made as protection from the outdoor elements. The idea that he has taken his off may imply that he would no longer stray, hinting at his fidelity towards his wife, potentially signifying that, for religious reasons, he would not remarry after her death. This is further used as proof that the female subject was painted posthumously.

In January 2018, the woman's dress was the subject of the BBC Four programme A Stitch in Time with fashion historian Amber Butchart.

== Provenance ==
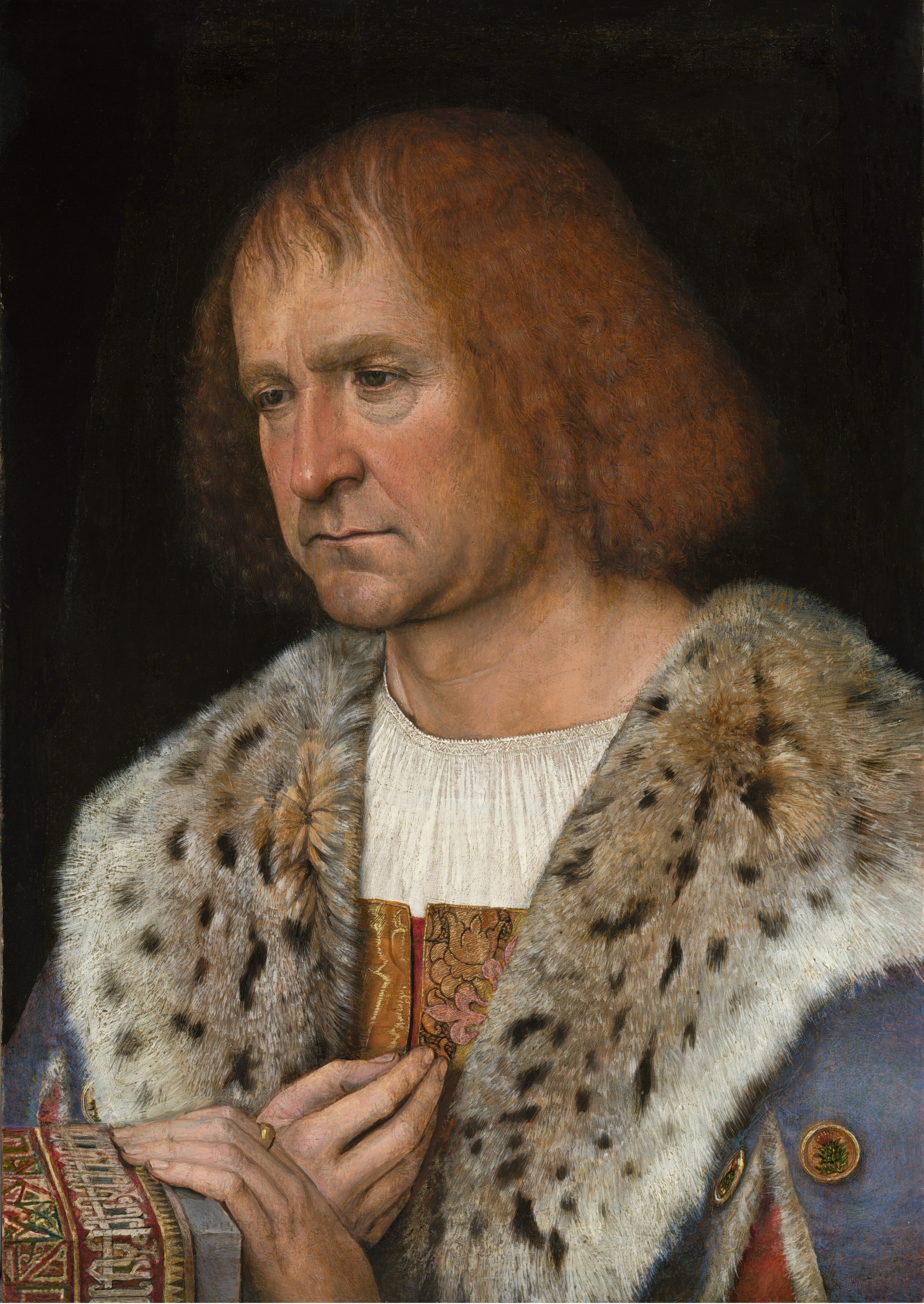
Diego de Guevara, who gave the painting to the Habsburgs, by Michael Sittow, c. 1517.

The provenance of the painting begins in 1435, when it was dated by van Eyck and presumably owned by the sitter(s). At some point before 1516, it came into the possession of Don Diego de Guevara (d. Brussels 1520), a Spanish career courtier of the Habsburgs (himself the subject of a fine portrait by Michael Sittow in the National Gallery of Art). He lived most of his life in the Netherlands, and may have known the Arnolfinis in their later years.

By 1516, he had given the portrait to Margaret of Austria, Habsburg Regent of the Netherlands, when it shows up as the first item in an inventory of her paintings, made in her presence at Mechelen. The item says (in French): "a large picture which is called Hernoul le Fin with his wife in a chamber, which was given to Madame by Don Diego, whose arms are on the cover of the said picture; done by the painter Johannes". A note in the margin says "It is necessary to put on a lock to close it: which Madame has ordered to be done." In a 1523–24 Mechelen inventory, a similar description is given, although this time the name of the subject is given as "Arnoult Fin".

In 1530, the painting was inherited by Margaret's niece Mary of Hungary, who in 1556 went to live in Spain. It is clearly described in an inventory taken after her death in 1558, when it was inherited by Philip II of Spain. A painting of two of his young daughters, Infantas Isabella Clara Eugenia and Catalina Micaela of Spain (Prado), commissioned by Philip, clearly copies the pose of the figures. In 1599, a German visitor saw it in the Alcazar Palace in Madrid. Now it had verses from Ovid painted on the frame: "See that you promise: what harm is there in promises? In promises anyone can be rich". It is very likely that Velázquez knew the painting, which may have influenced his Las Meninas, which shows a room in the same palace. In 1700, the painting appeared in an inventory after the death of Carlos II with shutters and the verses from Ovid.

The painting survived the fire in the Alcazar, which destroyed some of the Spanish royal collection, and by 1794 had been moved to the "Palacio Nuevo", the present Royal Palace of Madrid. In 1816, the painting was in London, in the possession of Colonel James Hay, a Scottish soldier. He claimed that after he was seriously wounded at the Battle of Waterloo the previous year, the painting hung in the room where he convalesced in Brussels. He fell in love with it, and persuaded the owner to sell. More relevant to the real facts is Hay's presence at the Battle of Vitoria (1813) in Spain, where a large coach loaded by order of its de facto King Joseph Bonaparte with easily portable artworks was part-plundered by British troops. The bulk was recovered by their commanders and returned to the legitimate Spanish throne, who arguably owed the British army a debt for regaining full Spanish independence.

Hay offered the painting to the Prince Regent, later George IV of the United Kingdom, via Sir Thomas Lawrence. The Prince had it on approval for two years at Carlton House before eventually returning it in 1818. Around 1828, Hay gave it to a friend to look after, not seeing it or the friend for the next thirteen years, until he arranged for it to be included in a public exhibition in 1841. It was bought the following year (1842) by the recently formed National Gallery, London, for £600, as inventory number 186, where it remains. By then the shutters had gone, along with the original frame.

== See also ==
- Arnolfini, Bristol
- List of works by Jan van Eyck
