= Carlos Guevara =

Carlos Guevara may refer to:

- Carlos Arvelo Guevara (1784–1862), Venezuelan physician and academic
- Carlos Guevara (footballer) (born 1930), Mexican football player
- Carlos Rodríguez Guevara (born 1969), Mexican politician
- Carlos Eduardo Guevara Villabón (born 1977), Colombian politician
- Carlos Guevara (baseball) (born 1982), American baseball player
