= Ruben Guevara =

Ruben Guevara or Rubén Guevara may refer to:

- Ruben Guevara, leader of Ruben and the Jets, an American rock band, active between 1972 and 1974
- Rubén Guevara (actor), in the 2019 Venezuelan film Infection
- Rubén Guevara (Panamanian footballer) (born 1964), retired Panamanian footballer and manager
- Rubén Guevara (Salvadoran footballer) (born 1962), former Salvadoran football player and manager, coached C.D. FAS from 2001
