= Diego de Guevara =

Spanish courtier and ambassador

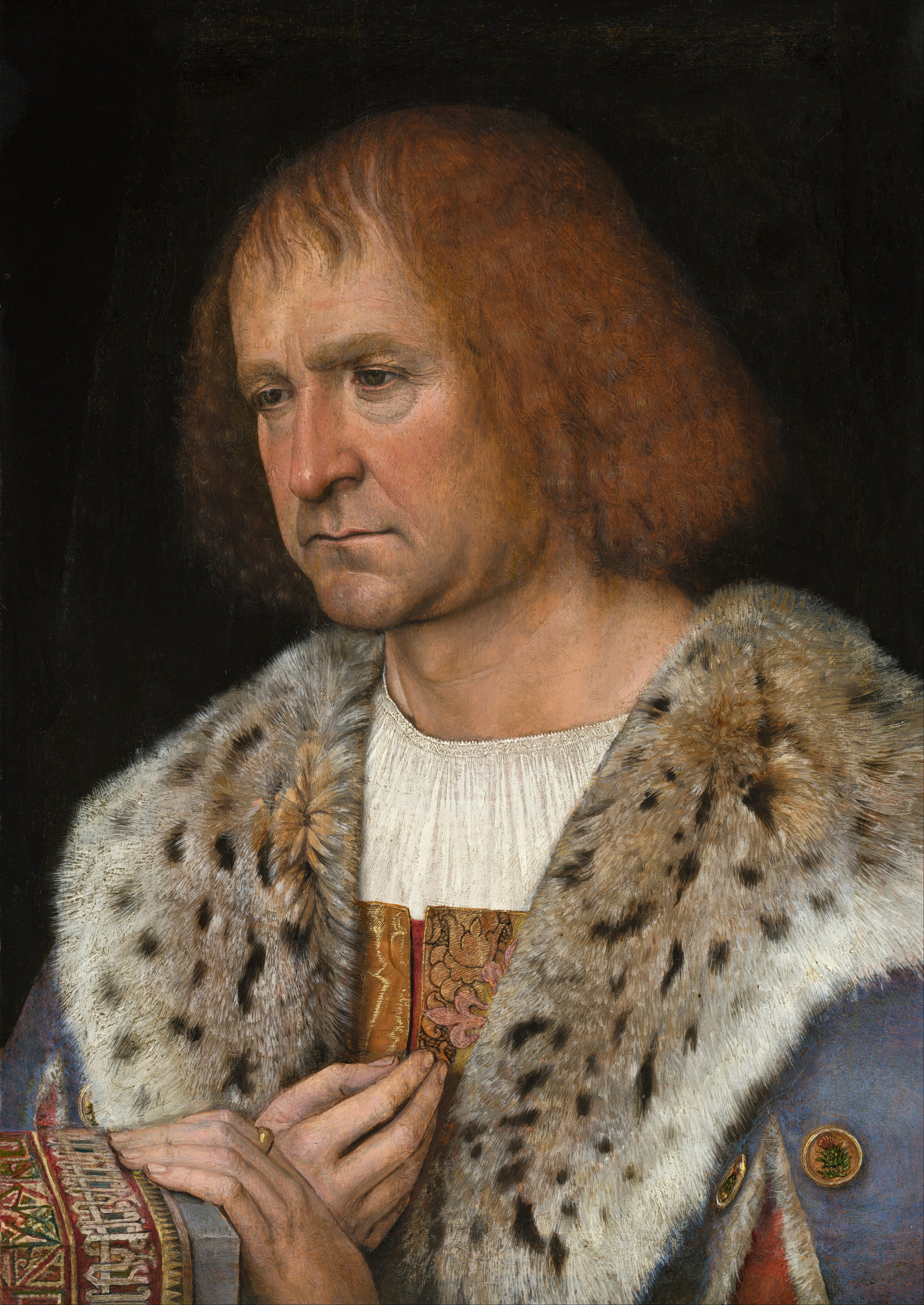
Possible portrait of Diego de Guevara, by Michael Sittow, c. 1517

Don Diego de Guevara (c. 1450 – 1520) was a Spanish courtier and ambassador who served four, possibly five, successive Dukes of Burgundy, spanning the Valois and Habsburg dynasties, mostly in the Low Countries. He was also a significant art collector.

== Career ==
He was a younger son of Ladrón de Guevara, Lord of Escalante near Santander in northern Spain, and his date of birth is unknown, but may have been as early as "about 1450". After his death the Constable of Castile wrote to Charles V praising Guevara's more than forty years of service to the Dukes of Burgundy. He may have been at the Burgundian court as a page or valet de chambre from a relatively young age, and an early 16th-century source says he spent toute jeunesse ("all [his] youth") at the court. His older brother, another Ladrón de Guevara, had been in the Burgundian court long before him, before 1461 according to a 16th-century history of the family. This also said that Diego was an esquire of the Valois Duke Charles the Bold at the disastrous Battle of Nancy in 1477, and threw himself over Charles' dead body to protect it. He is recorded as an esquire of Charles's daughter and successor Mary of Burgundy at the time of her death in 1482, and continued in the service of her son Philip the Handsome, Duke of Burgundy.

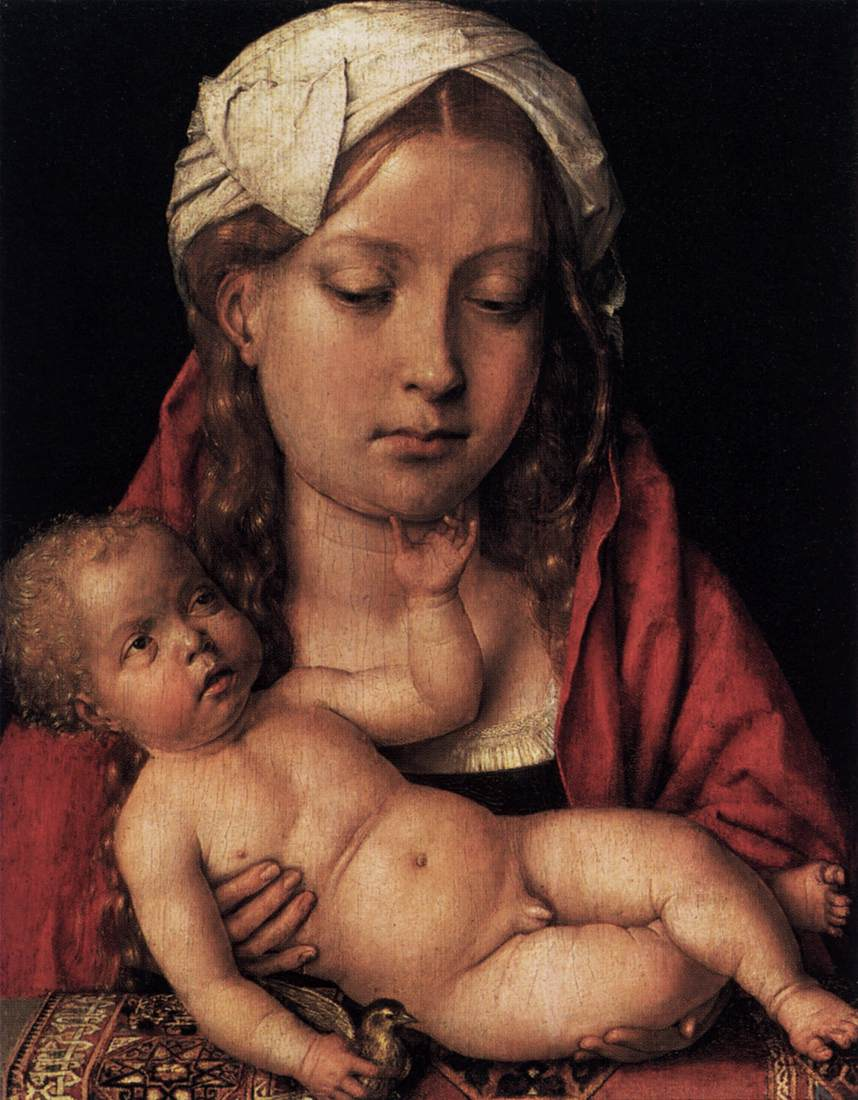
The Sittow Berlin Madonna and Child that was in a diptych with Guevara's portrait

He rose through the ranks of the ducal household, becoming chamberlain by 1501. He was first maitre d'hotel to Philip's wife, Queen Joanna of Castile (Joanna the Mad) when the couple travelled to Spain in 1506. He was used as an ambassador, then usually an appointment for a relatively brief mission, to England and the court of Ferdinand II of Aragon. After Philip's death in 1506, Diego became councillor and chamberlain to Philip's son Charles V, Holy Roman Emperor. Charles appointed him knight and warden (clavaría) of the Order of Calatrava in 1517, and in 1518 Mayordomo mayor, an important role in charge of his personal apartments and arrangements.

Diego de Guevara died in Brussels on 15 December 1520. He was a cousin of Antonio de Guevara, and had at least one child, his illegitimate son Felipe (see below).

It is possible that his female relatives lived in the Netherlands with him. A portrait by the Master of the Legend of the Magdalen, shows a lady in a Netherlandish outfit, described as Marguerite (de) Guevara, lady in waiting to Eleanor of Austria.

== Art collector ==
There are various references to works of art owned by him, and several well-known survivals. Diego de Guevara owned the famous Arnolfini Portrait by Jan van Eyck, dated 1434 and now in the National Gallery, London and gave it to Margaret of Austria by 1516, as an inventory of her goods made that year records. How it had come into his hands is unknown. Margaret was Mary of Burgundy's other child and by 1516 Habsburg Regent for her nephew Charles V in the Netherlands.

Guevara's presumed portrait by his fellow courtier Michael Sittow, perhaps of about 1517 and now in the National Gallery of Art, Washington, is identified firstly by a description of what seems to be the same painting in the Comenturas de la Pintura ("Commentary on Painting", c. 1560) by Guevara's illegitimate son Felipe de Guevara, a Renaissance humanist notable for this work. There is also an identification of Diego de Guevara as subject of a portrait in 1548 in the inventory of the Spanish widow of Hendrik III of Nassau, an ally and close friend of Charles V who was a general and diplomat for the Habsburgs. There the portrait forms half of a diptych with a Madonna and Child, which is identified with one in the Gemäldegalerie, Berlin, which matches the Washington portrait in size and other details. Like other Sittow Madonnas, it is thought that the painting was also a portrait of a princess at the court, and one suggestion for this and another Sittow portrait is Katherine of Aragon, who was later queen to Henry VIII of England. The portrait of Guevara shows, emerging from beneath his fur collar, the embroidered cross of the Order of Calatrava, which x-ray photographs show was added in the course of painting.

His son also says he was in possession of a portrait of Diego painted by Rogier van der Weyden (died 1464), for which no surviving candidates have been identified; he would have been a very young man at the time. Guevara was also a keen collector of Hieronymous Bosch, and in 1570-4 and 1596 Philip II of Spain bought several panels from Diego and Filipe's descendants, including The Haywain Triptych and Cutting the Stone now in the Prado.
