= Hilda Guevara =

Peruvian politician

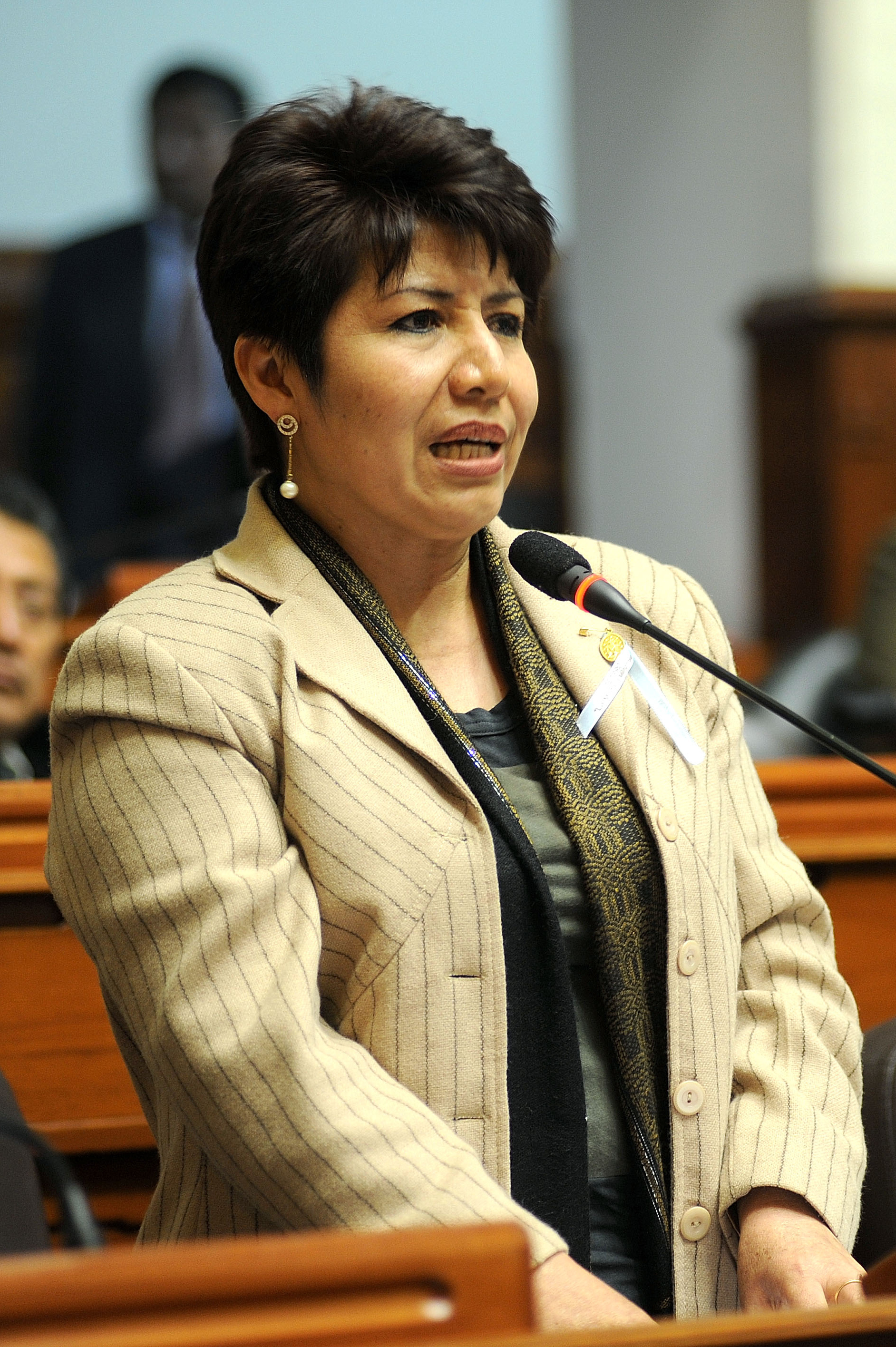
Hilda Guevara

Hilda Elizabeth Guevara Gómez is a Peruvian politician and was Congresswoman representing Moquegua for the 2006–2011 term. Guevara belongs to the Peruvian Aprista Party.
