= Antonio de Guevara =

16th-century Spanish bishop and author

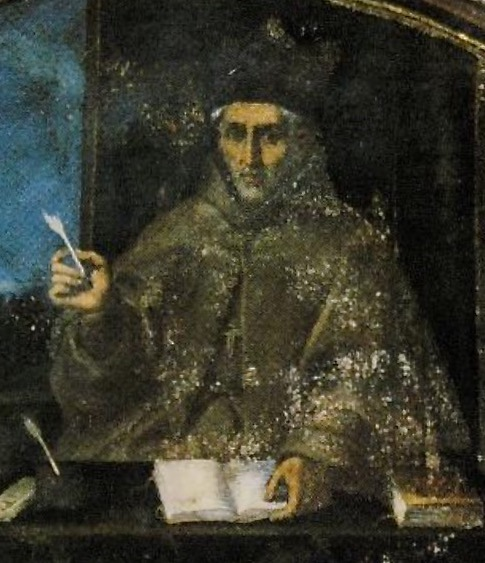
Antonio de Guevara, 16th century portrait (cropped)

Antonio de Guevara (c. 1481 – 3 April 1545) was a Spanish bishop and author. In 1527, he was named royal chronicler to Charles V, Holy Roman Emperor. His first book Libro áureo first appeared in pirated editions the following year. This pseudo-historical book of incidents and letters from the life of Marcus Aurelius (known in a later expanded edition as Relox de principes) was translated into nearly every language of Europe, including Russian, Swedish, Hungarian, Polish, Armenian, and Romanian.

The popularity of Guevara's book led scholar and translator Méric Casaubon to remark that no book besides the Bible was so often translated as Guevara's Relox de principes, or Dial of Princes. Besides his book of Marcus Aurelius, Guevara wrote eight other books, some of which continued to be translated and republished in the seventeenth and eighteenth centuries.

== Biography ==
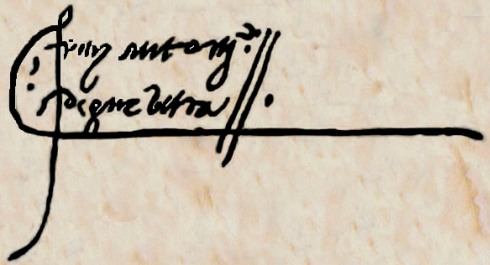
Signature of Antonio de Guevara

Born in Treceño in the province of Cantabria, he spent some of his youth at the court of Isabella I of Castile. In 1505 he entered the Franciscan order. He successively held the offices of Charles V, Holy Roman Emperor's court preacher, court historiographer, Bishop of Guadix, Bishop of Mondoñedo and counselor to Charles V. He travelled in the royal entourage during Charles V's journeys to Italy and other parts of Europe. His most well-known work, entitled The Dial of Princes (Reloj de príncipes in its original Spanish), was published at Valladolid in 1529, and, according to its author, the fruit of eleven years' labour, is a mirror for princes in the form of a didactic novel, designed after the manner of Xenophon's Cyropaedia, to delineate in a somewhat ideal way, for the benefit of modern sovereigns, the life, and character of an ancient prince, Marcus Aurelius, distinguished for wisdom and virtue. It was often reprinted in Spanish; it so speedily attained fame that before the close of the century, there were published several translations in Latin, Italian, French, German, Dutch and English. The two earliest English translations are by Lord Berners (London, 1534) and later by Thomas North. This book appeared in an earlier form in 1528 in pirated editions as Libro Aureo. The pseudo-historical nature of the book gave rise to a literary controversy, the author having claimed in his prologue that the book was drawn from an imaginary manuscript in a library belonging to the Medicis in Florence.

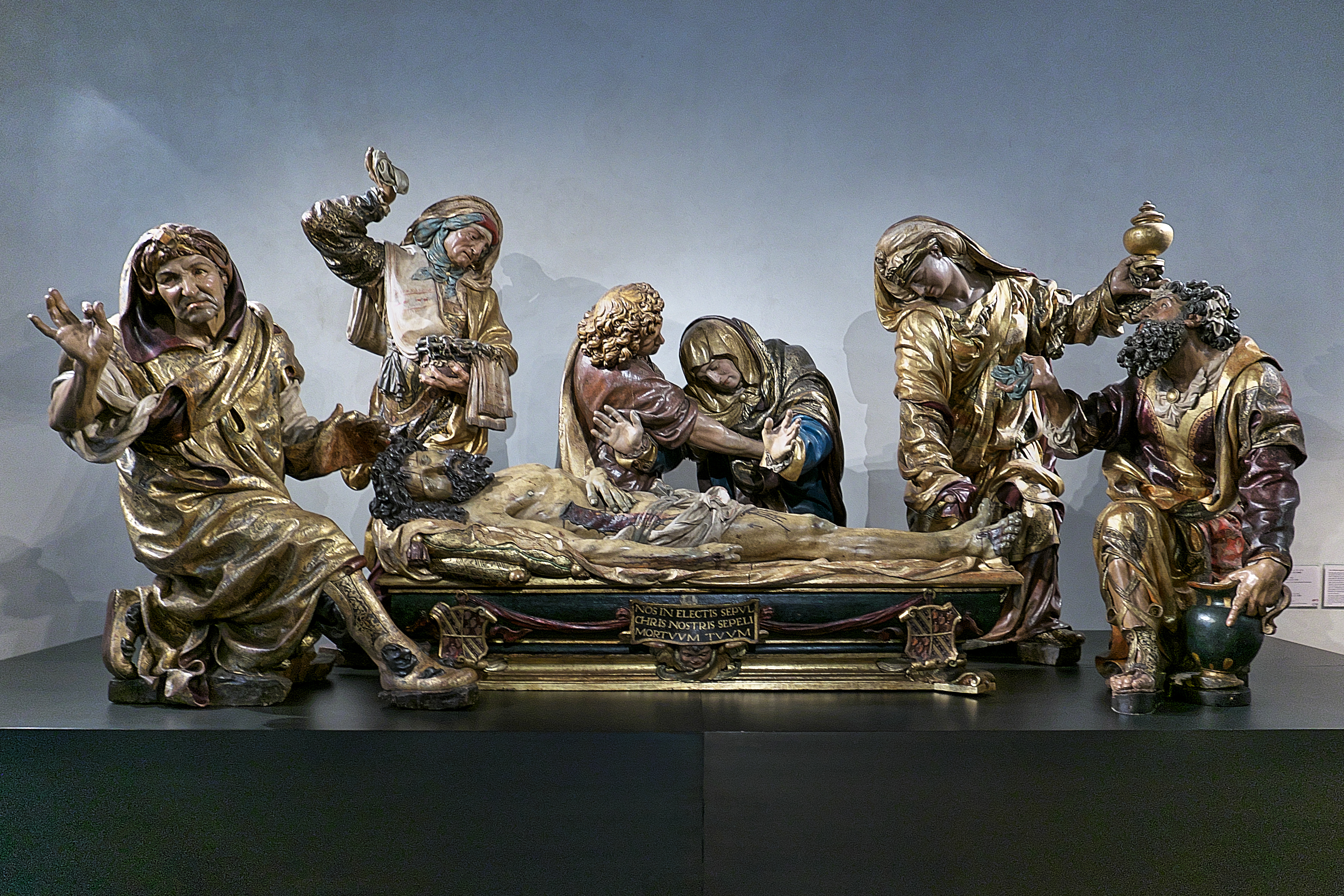
Group of mourners at Christ's entombment, polychrome wooden statuary work by Juan de Juni, commissioned for the tomb of Guevara in the Convento de San Francisco (Valladolid)

Other works of Guevara include the four works published in a single volume in Valladolid in 1539: Década de los Césares, or Lives of the Ten Roman Emperors in imitation of the manner of Plutarch and Suetonius; the Epístolas familiares, or The Familiar Epistles; Libro de los inventores del arte de marear, on the art of navigation; and Aviso de privados y doctrina de cortesanos. In this last-mentioned work, known in the English translation of Edward Hellowes as The Favored Courtier, Guevara anatomized the concept of the courtier and, thus, the society of the royal court. Guevara, who most certainly had read Il Cortegiano (1518) by Baldassare Castiglione—whom Charles V called the greatest courtier of his age—brought a different aspect to the figure of the courtier: while the latter's work was a 'behavioral' guide, Guevara described the practical aspects of men surrounding a monarch and differentiated their duties from those who were part of religious orders in a famous passage in Chapter 1:

En la Religión si se levanta a media noche, es por loar al Señor en el culto Divino; mas en la Corte infinitas veces trasnochan, no por más de cumplir con el mundo.

"As far as religion is concerned, if one wakes up in the middle of night, it is to laud the Lord in the Divine worship. But at the court, they stay awake all night infinite times, for no other reason than to keep up with the world."

Besides the controversy mentioned above, there was another regarding the two chapters on the Danubian Farmer, which appeared in different versions both in the Libro áureo and the Reloj de príncipes in which it has been argued the Farmer is a metaphor for the New World Indigenous peoples and the Roman Empire is nothing less than the Spanish Empire.

Guevara died in Mondoñedo. He was the cousin of Diego de Guevara.

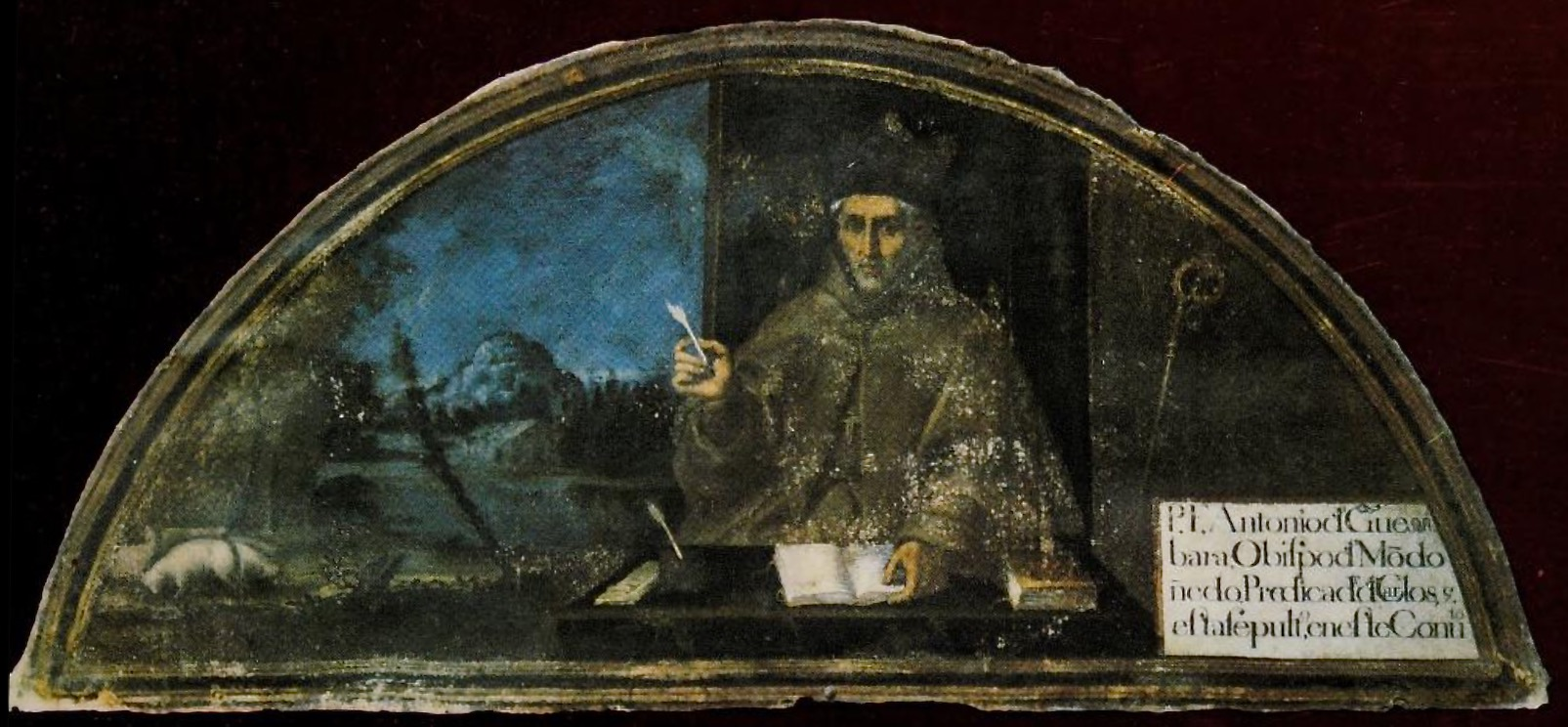
Undated portrait of Antonio de Guevara from a Franciscan monastery.

== Criticism and legacy ==
Critical attitudes toward Guevara's literary works may be roughly grouped into three phases: first, a period of great popularity throughout Europe peaking in the mid- to late-sixteenth century; second, a period during which Guevara's works were censured on stylistic grounds and using spurious citations and historical references, and consequently devalued; and, thirdly, in the twentieth and twenty-first centuries, a rediscovery and more positive reassessment of his work.

The attitude of censure towards Guevara's work first arose against the liberties he took in his pseudo-histories. Pedro de Rhúa, in his Cartas censorias, wrote three letters to Guevara expressing indignation that Guevara had written "fantasies for histories". Pierre Bayle's judgment in his Dictionary Historical and Critical is in many ways representative of a negative view of Guevara's work prevailing during the late Renaissance and Enlightenment periods:

Guevara, (Antony de), preacher and historiographer to the emperor Charles V, was born in the province of Alaba in Spain. He was brought up at court; but after the death of queen Isabella of Castile, he turned a Franciscan friar, and very honourable employments in his order. Afterwards, having made himself known at court, he was made a preacher to Charles V, and was much esteemed for his politeness, eloquence, and great parts. He ought to have been contented with the glory he got by his tongue; for, pretending to write books, he made himself ridiculous to good judges. His high-flown and figurative style, full of antitheses, is not the greatest fault of his works. An ill taste, and a wrong notion of eloquence, put him upon such a way of writing; which was an inconsiderable thing, if compared with his extravagant way of handling history. He broke the most sacred and essential laws of it, with a boldness that cannot be sufficiently detested; and he shewed that no man was ever so unworthy of the character of Chronicler to Charles V, which was given him. He alleged a very bad excuse, when he was censured for it: he pretended, that, excepting the holy scripture, all other histories are too uncertain to be credited.

Bayle concludes his entry on Guevara by stating of The Dial of Princes that "if the French are to blame for having highly valued such a book, the Spaniards who have esteemed it still more, deserve more to be laughed at".

In the twentieth century, scholarship on Guevara grew considerably. Book-length studies by Redondo, Ernest Grey, Joseph R. Jones, and Horacio Chiong Rivero have recounted Guevara's harsh critical reception and made strong cases for his importance. Presently Guevara's complete works are freely available in accurate HTML editions at Filosofia. The scholar and editor Emilio Blanco has edited works by and about Guevara and in 2018 delivered public lectures on the life and works of Guevara at the Fundación Juan March in Madrid.

== Works ==
- Libro áureo de Marco Aurelio (Sevilla, 1528)
- Reloj de príncipes (Valladolid, 1529)
- Las obras del illustre señor don Antonio de gueuara (Valladolid, 1539)
  - Una década de Césares, es a saber: Las vidas de diez emperadores romanos que imperaron en los tiempos del buen Marco Aurelio
  - Aviso de privados y doctrina de cortesanos
  - Menosprecio de corte y alabanza de aldea
  - Arte del Marear y de los inventores de ella: con muchos avisos para los que navegan en ellas
- Epístolas familiares (1539, 1541)
- Oratorio de religiosos y ejercicio de virtuosos (Valladolid, 1542)
- Monte Calvario, parts 1 and 2 (1545, 1549)

== English translations ==
- The Golden Boke of Marcus Aurelius Emperour, trans. John Bourchier, 2nd Baron Berners (Lord Berners) (London: Thomas Berthelet, 1535). 1559, 1566, 1586
- A dispraise of the life of a courtier, and a commendacion of the life of the labouryng man, trans. Sir Francis Bryan (1548)
- The Diall of Princes, trans. Thomas North (London: John Waylande, 1557; republished as The Dial of Princes, London: Richarde Tottill and Thomas Marshe, 1568)
- The Favored Courtier, trans. Edward Hellowes (1563)
- A Looking Glasse for the Court, trans. Sir Francis Bryan and Thomas Tymme (London: William Norton, 1575)
- The familiar epistles of Sir Anthony of Gueuara, preacher, chronicler, and counceller to the Emperour Charles the fifth, trans. Edward Hellowes (London: Ralph Newberry, 1575?)
- A chronicle, conteyning the liues of tenne emperours of Rome, trans. Edward Hellowes (London: Ralph Newberrie, 1577)
- A booke of the inuention of the art of nauigation and of the greate trauelles whiche they passe that saile in Gallies, trans. Edward Hellowes (London: Ralph Newberry, 1578)
- The Mount of Caluarie, (London: Printed by A. Islip for E. White, 1595)
- Mount Caluarie, the Second Part, (London: Printed by A. Islip for E. White, 1597)
- Archontorologion : Or The diall of princes: containing the golden and famovs booke of Marcvs Avrelivs, sometime emperour of Rome, trans. Sir Thomas North (London: B. Alsop, 1619)
- Spanish Letters: Historical, Satyrical, and Moral, trans. John Savage (London, 1697)
- The mysteries of mount Calvary, trans. Rev. Orbley Shipley (London: Ribingtons, 1868)
- A Looking Glasse for the Court, trans. Sir Francis Bryan and Jessica Sequeira. Seattle: Sublunary Editions, 2021.
