= Carlos Rodríguez Guevara =

Mexican politician (born 1969)

- Born: 19 December 1969 (age 56); Guanajuato, Mexico
- Occupation: Politician
- Political party: PAN

Carlos Rodríguez Guevara (born 19 December 1969) is a Mexican politician from the National Action Party. In 2009 he served as Deputy of the LX Legislature of the Mexican Congress representing Guanajuato.
