= Isabel de Guevara =

Isabel de Guevara (fl. 1530 – after 1556) was one of the few European women to accept the offer from the Spanish crown to join colonizing missions to the New World during the first wave of conquest and settlement. Guevara sailed in 1534 the first voyage of Pedro de Mendoza and with a group of 1,500 colonists, including twenty women. It left from Cádiz and was bound for the Río de la Plata region of what is now Argentina. According to Spanish archives, she “suffered all the discomforts and dangers of the conquest.” De Guevara's correspondences paint one of the most elaborate, enduring portraits of the hazards of colonial life.

Within three months of arrival, because of hostile indigenous people, starvation, and hardship, Isabel de Guevara estimated that a thousand of the settlers who had arrived with her in the New World had died of hunger. Estimates by other colonists at the time went as high as 10,000.

== Colonial conquests ==
In one of her earliest letters, de Guevara described leaving 160 colonists behind as a defensive force while "400 men and some horses” went ahead to the new fort of Corpus Christi. Nearly half of these men died on the mission. De Guevara survived and described her companions as “very withered, their teeth and lips black, look more like dead men than live ones.”

By 1556, de Guevara had been in America for 22 years. She had lost her brother or her father (the records are unclear) and was without family. She left Buenos Aires, when the fort there was deserted, to make the perilous 1,300-kilometre (800 mi) trip up the Paraná River to Asunción, the capital of Paraguay. In 1542, she entered an arranged marriage with Pedro de Esquivel, a Castilian who was later executed during the internecine political wars.

In a letter she wrote in July 2, 1556 to Princess Juana of Spain, who was the head of the Council on the Indies, Isabel de Guevara argued that her labors entitled her to a partition of land and indigenous slaves. She wrote that because hunger had caused the male colonists to "fade into weakness," "all of the work was left to the women," including civilian and military functions. The letter wrote by Guevara is the first-known text to recount the conquest and colonization from Río de la Plata from the female point of view as well as one of the first critical testimonies of those processes

Isabel de Guevara's letter is also a legal document and a defiance and challenge to the Martínez de Irala's laws which prohibited women from receiving encomiendas, as such, she questions power relations by showing how displeased she is for being excluded from the repartimientos.
