= Lotfi Jbara =

Tunisian football manager

Personal information
- Date of birth: 19 June 1961 (age 65)
- Place of birth: Tunis
- Position: Defender

International career
Years	Team	Apps	(Gls)
1984–1987	Tunisia	9	(0)

Managerial career
- 2015–2016: Fanja
- 2019: DRB Tadjenanet

Lotfi Jbara (Arabic: لُطْفِيّ جَبَّارَة; born 19 June 1961) is a Tunisian footballer and later manager.
