= Felipe de Guevara =

Spanish humanist and art writer and patron (died 1563)

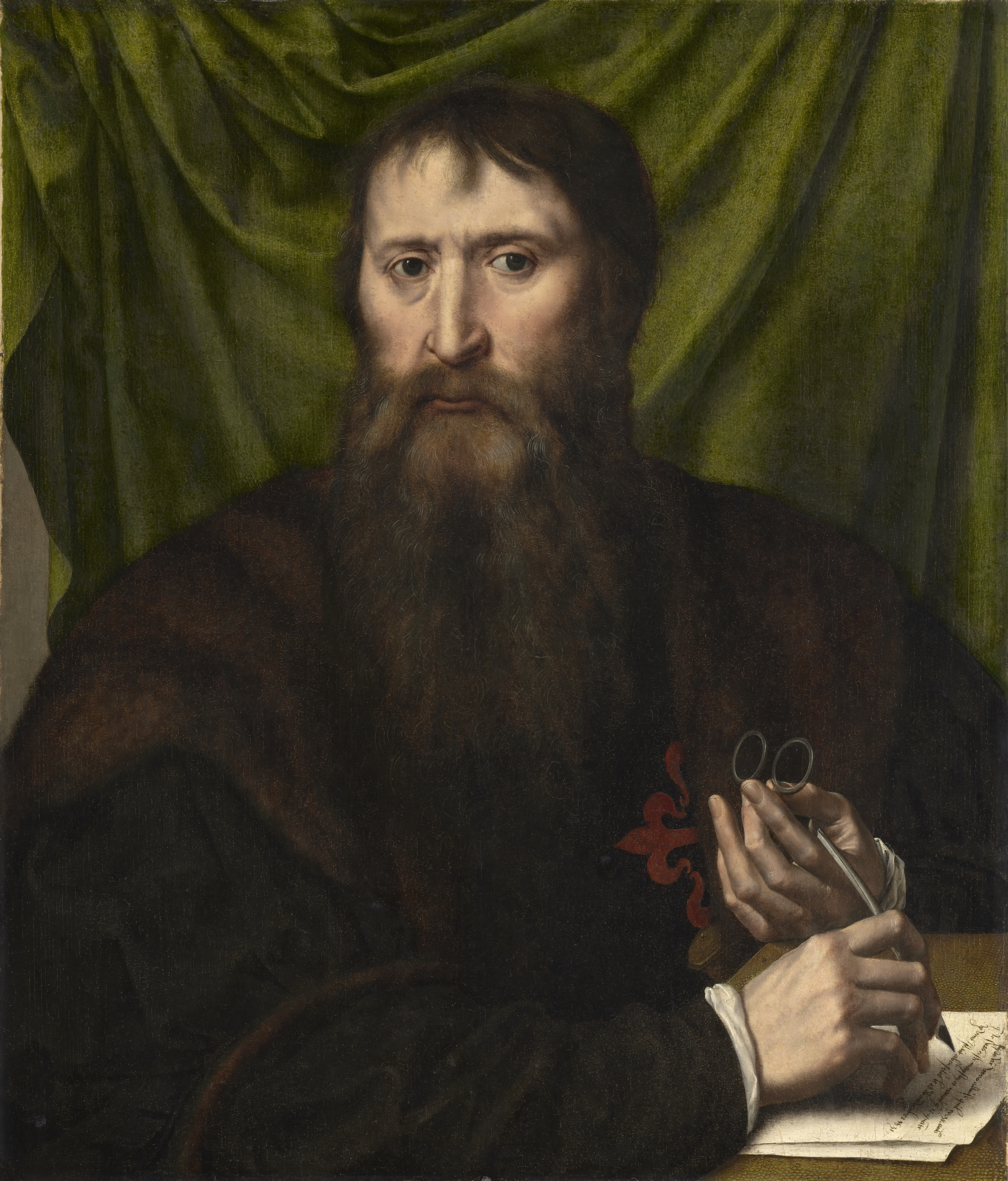
Portrait of Felipe de Guevara by Jan Cornelisz Vermeyen.

Felipe de Guevara (died 1563) was a Spanish humanist, art writer and patron.

Felipe was the illegitimate son of ambassador and art collector Diego de Guevara. He maintained close relations with people of the world of culture of his time. He was interested in various fields of knowledge such as numismatics, geography and history. Like his father, he also had a great passion for art. He had a great appreciation for the work in particular of Hieronymus Bosch, who was featured in his great work Comentarios de la pintura (Comments on Painting). He died in Madrid.

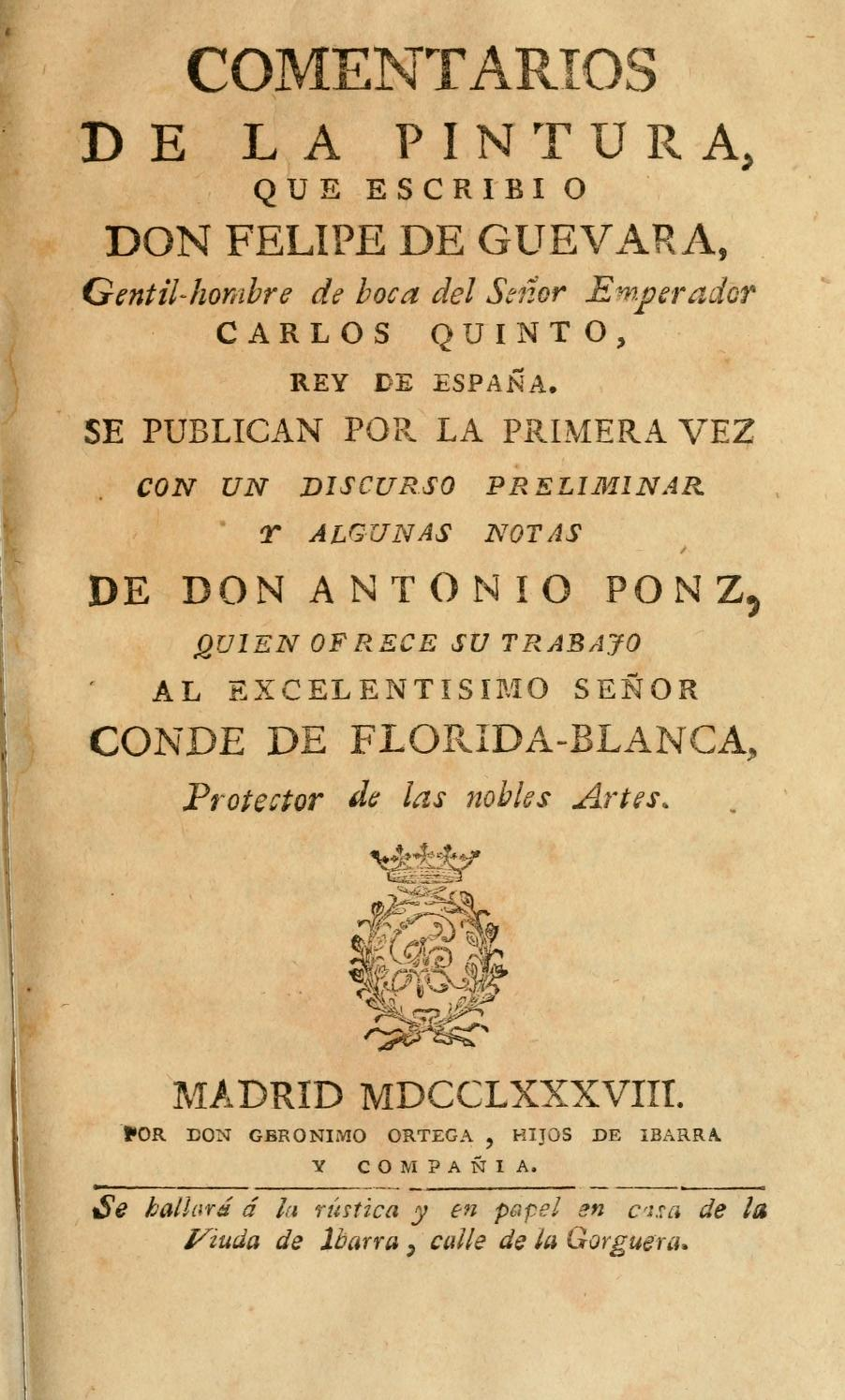
Comentarios de la pintura (Comments on Painting) by Felipe de Guevara, written in 1560 and published in 1788

His work remained as a manuscript until it was published in 1788 by Antonio Ponz. Sánchez Cantón felt it was probably written around 1560, shortly before his death. In his "Commentaries" Felipe devotes a section to fresco painting, the grotesques, painting on canvas, encaustic, lighting, mosaics, and oil. He refers to the writings of Pliny the Elder regarding the invention of painting in encaustic by Aristides (although Guevara believes that it was used previously), and its perfection by Praxiteles. He also credits the ancients with the invention of oil painting, a technique that in the sixteenth century was considered of recent origin. The most interesting chapter of Guevara's work is about fresco and stucco decoration, which steps through the implementation process and the materials used at the time. Although it refers to the text of Vitruvius, this source is continuously compared with traditional uses of Spain, making the passage a document of the first order for this technique, popular in the 16th century.
