= List of architectural design competitions =

This is a list of notable architectural design competitions worldwide.

== Major architecture competitions by country ==
=== Australia ===
- Flinders Street station, Melbourne – Fawcett and Ashworth, 1899 (17 entries)
- Shrine of Remembrance, Melbourne – Phillip Hudson and James Wardrop, 1923 (83 entries; open to Australian and British architects only)
- Shrine of Remembrance, Brisbane – Buchanan and Cowper, 1928
- ANZAC War Memorial, Sydney – Charles Bruce Dellit, 1929 (117 entries)
- Opera House, Sydney – Jørn Utzon, 1955 (233 entries)
- Parliament House, Canberra – Romaldo Giurgola, 1978 (329 entries)
- Federation Square, Melbourne – Lab Architecture Studio, 1997 (177 entries)
- Flinders Street station renewal, Melbourne – Hassell + Herzog & de Meuron, 2013 (118 entries)

=== Austria ===
- Vienna Ring Road – Ludwig Förster – Friedrich August von Stache – Eduard van der Nüll and August Sicard von Sicardsburg, 1858 (85 international participants)
- Vienna State Opera – August Sicard von Sicardsburg and Eduard van der Nüll, 1860
- Karlskirche, Vienna – Johann Bernhard Fischer von Erlach, 1713
- Votivkirche, Vienna – Heinrich Ferstel, 1854 (75 international participants)
- Austrian Postal Savings Bank, Vienna, 1903
- City Hall, Innsbruck – Dominique Perrault, 1994

=== Belgium ===
- Concertgebouw, Bruges – Robbrecht & Daem, Eugéne Van Assche and Michel van Langenhove, 1998 (41 entries)
- Museum aan de Stroom, Antwerp – Neutelings Riedijk Architects, 1999 (55 participants)
- Kanal, Brussels – noAarchitecten, EM2N and Sergison Bates architects, 2017

=== Brazil ===
- City of Brasília – Oscar Niemeyer and Lúcio Costa, 1957 (47 final submissions). The goal was to build a new capital in 1000 days.

=== Canada ===
Between 1960 and 2000, close to 150 competitions had been held in Canada.

- City Hall, Toronto – Viljo Revell, 1956 (500 entries)
- University of Manitoba – Visionary (re)Generation, Winnipeg – Janet Roseberg & Studio Inc. with Cibinel Architects Ltd. and Landmark Planning & Design Inc., 2013 (45 international participants)

=== China ===
- Beijing National Stadium – Herzog & de Meuron, 2001 (13 final submissions).
- China Central Television Headquarters – Office for Metropolitan Architecture, 2002 (10 submissions)
- Beijing National Aquatics Center – PTW Architects and Arup, 2003 (10 proposals)

=== Denmark ===
- Royal Danish Library, Copenhagen – Schmidt Hammer Lassen, 1993 (179 entries)
- Geo Centre Møns Klint, Møn Island – PLH Architects, 2002 (292 entries)

=== Egypt ===
- Bibliotheca Alexandrina – Snøhetta, 1998 (523 entries)
- Grand Egyptian Museum - Heneghan Peng Architects, 2025 (1,557 entries)

=== Finland ===
Over the past 130 years, almost 2,000 architectural competitions have been held in Finland.

- Central railway station, Helsinki – Eliel Saarinen, 1904 (21 entries)
- Viipuri Library – Alvar Aalto, 1927
- Paimio Sanatorium – Alvar Aalto, 1929
- Säynätsalo Town Hall – Alvar Aalto, 1949
- Kiasma Contemporary Art Museum, Helsinki – Steven Holl, 1992 (516 entries)
- Guggenheim Helsinki Plan – 2014 (1,715 entries)

=== France ===
- Opera Garnier, Paris – Charles Garnier, 1861 (171 participants)
- Centre Georges Pompidou, Paris – Renzo Piano and Richard Rogers, 1971 (681 entries)
- Arab World Institute, Paris – Jean Nouvel, 1981
- Parc de la Villette, Paris – Bernard Tschumi, 1982 (471 entries)
- La Grande Arche de la Défense, Paris – Johann Otto von Spreckelsen, 1982 (420 entries)
- Cité de la Musique, Paris – Christian de Portzamparc, 1983
- Opéra Bastille, Paris – Carlos Ott, 1983 (750 entries)
- Carré d'Art, Nîmes – Norman Foster, 1984 (12 invited architects)
- Opéra National de Lyon, Lyon – Jean Nouvel, 1986

=== Germany ===
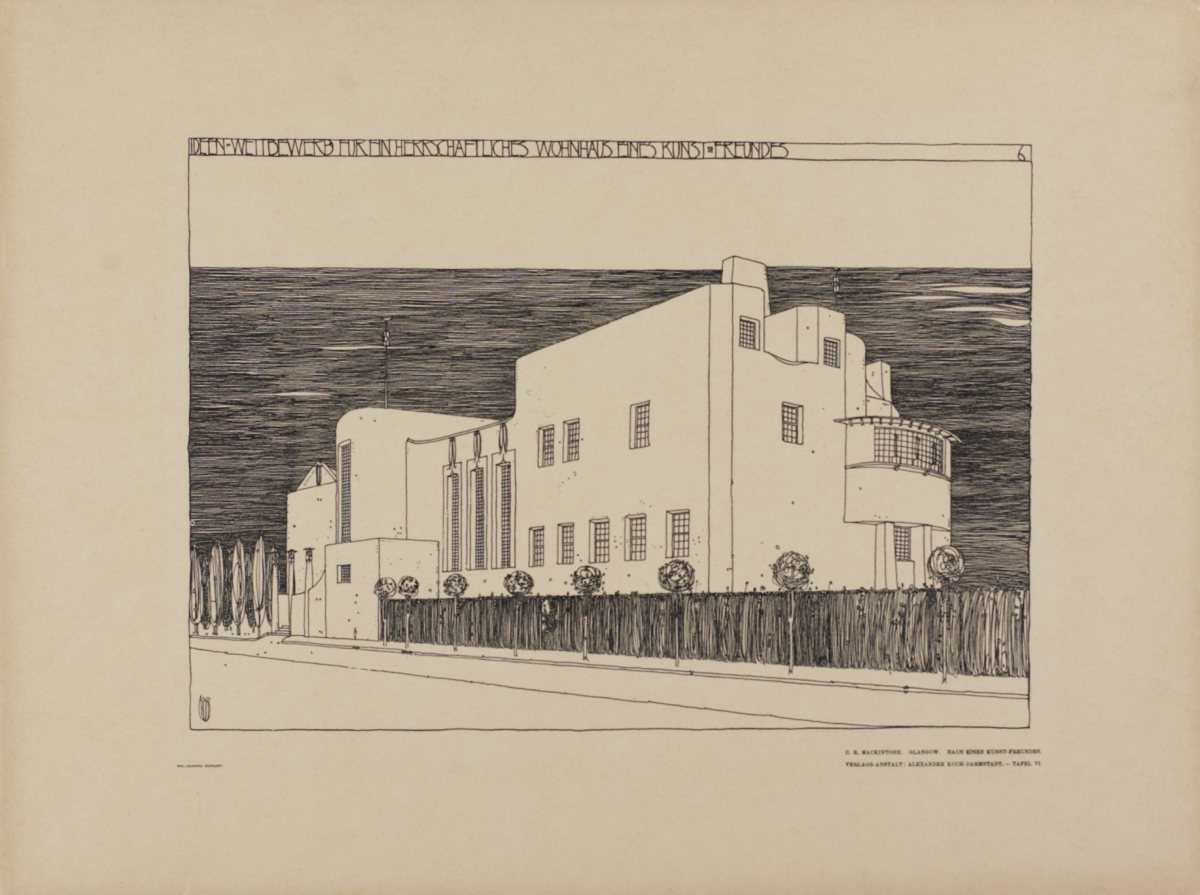
Competition entry by Charles Rennie Mackintosh for the House for an Art Lover 1901.

- Reichstag, Berlin, 1872 and 1882 (189 entries by German architects)
- Central Station, Hamburg – Heinrich Reinhardt, 1900
- House for an Art Lover, Darmstadt, 1901
- Berliner Philharmonie, Berlin – Hans Scharoun, 1956–57 (14 invited architects)
- Neue Staatsgalerie, Stuttgart – James Stirling, 1977
- International Building Exhibition, Berlin – various architects for several projects, 1980–1987
- Messeturm, Frankfurt am Main – Helmut Jahn, 1985
- Jewish Museum, Berlin Daniel Libeskind, 1989
- Commerzbank Tower, Frankfurt am Main – Norman Foster, 1991
- Reichstag building, Berlin – Norman Foster, 1992
- Central Station, Berlin – Gerkan, Marg and Partners, 1992
- Olympic velodrome and swimming pool, Berlin – Dominique Perrault, 1992
- Felix Nussbaum Museum, Osnabrück – Daniel Libeskind, 1995
- French Embassy, Berlin – Christian de Portzamparc, 1997 (7 invited architects)
- Phaeno Science Center, Wolfsburg – Zaha Hadid, 2000
- BMW Welt, Munich – COOP HIMMELB(L)AU, 2001
- BMW Werk, Leipzig – Zaha Hadid, 2002

=== Ireland ===
- U2 Tower, Dublin, 2002 (not yet built)

=== Italy ===
- Termini railway station, Rome, 1947

=== Japan ===
- Memorial Cathedral for World Peace, Hiroshima, 1947 (177 designs, no winner)
- Peace Memorial Museum, Hiroshima – Kenzo Tange, 1949
- New National Theatre, Tokyo – Takahiro Yanagisawa, 1984
- Tokyo Metropolitan Government Building, Tokyo – Kenzo Tange, 1985–1986
- Kansai International Airport – Renzo Piano, 1988
- Tokyo International Forum, Tokyo – Rafael Viñoly, 1987 (395 entries)

=== Lithuania ===
- Vilnius Guggenheim Hermitage Museum – Zaha Hadid – scheduled for completion in 2011

=== Luxembourg ===
- Philharmonie Luxembourg – Christian de Portzamparc, 1997

=== Mexico ===
- Guggenheim Guadalajara, Guadalajara, Jalisco – Enrique Norten/TEN Arquitectos

=== Netherlands ===
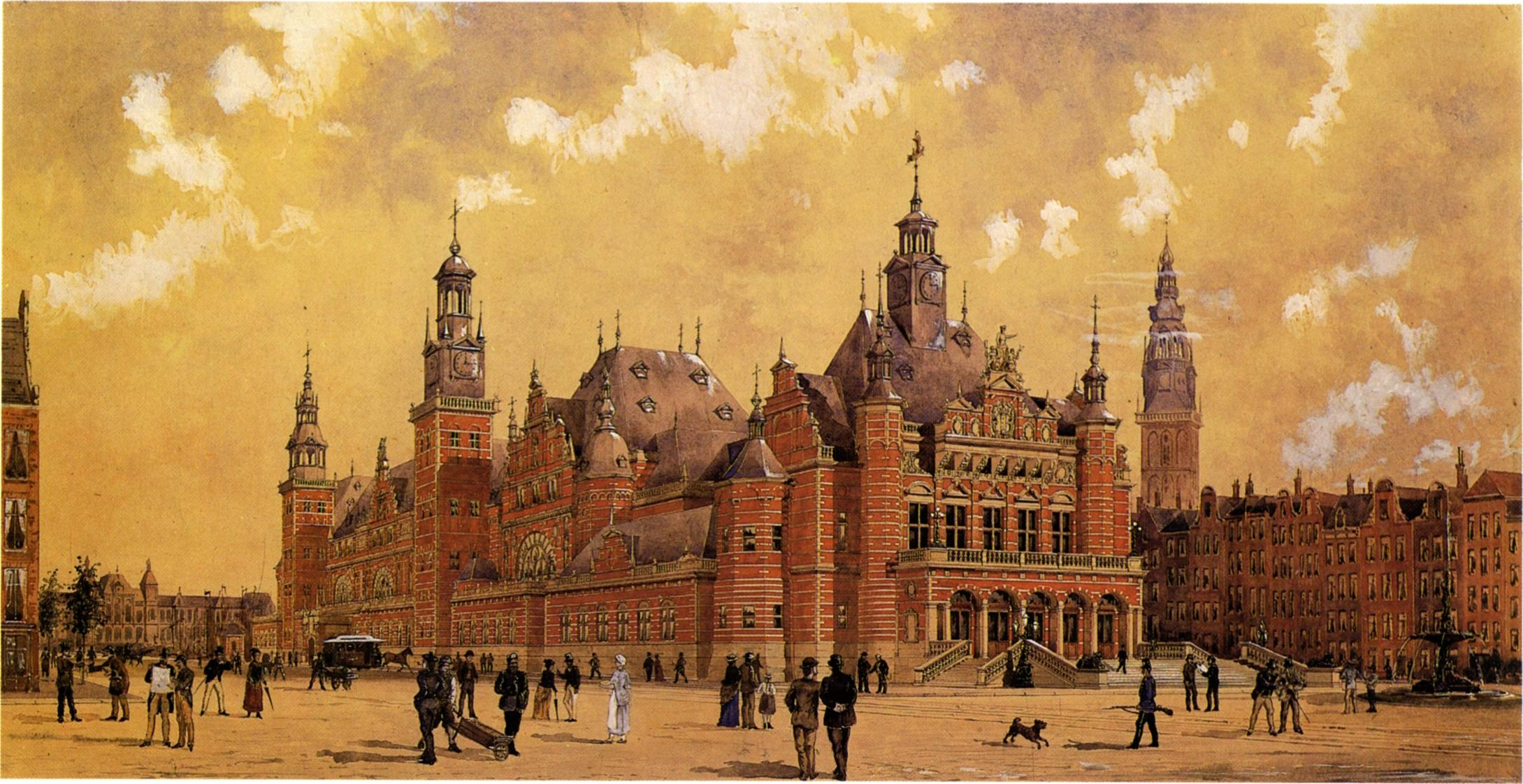
Hendrik Petrus Berlage and Theodorus Sanders: Competition design for a commodity exchange, Amsterdam

- Rijksmuseum, Amsterdam – Pierre Cuypers, 1863 and 1875
- Beurs, Amsterdam – Hendrik Petrus Berlage, 1884
- Peace Palace, The Hague – Louis M. Cordonnier, 1905
- Amsterdam City Hall – Wilhelm Holzbauer, Cees Dam, B. Bijvoet and G.H.M. Holt, 1967 (804 entries)
- The Hague City Hall – Richard Meier, 1986–1989
- Netherlands Architecture Institute, Rotterdam – Jo Coenen, 1988 (6 submissions)

=== New Caledonia ===
- Jean-Marie Tjibaou Cultural Centre, Nouméa – Renzo Piano, 1991

=== Norway ===
- Oslo Central Station, Oslo – John Engh

=== Russia ===
- Palace of Soviets, Moscow – Boris Iofan, 1931–1933, 160 architectural design entries (never built)
- Commisariat for Heavy Industry, Moscow, 1934

=== Spain ===
- Igualada Cemetery, Barcelona – Enric Miralles and Carme Pinós

=== Sweden ===
- City Hall, Stockholm, 1907

=== Switzerland ===
- Palace of Nations, Geneva, 1926, Henri Paul Nénot & Julien Flegenheimer; Carlo Broggi; Camille Lefèvre; Giuseppe Vago (377 entries)

=== United Kingdom ===
- Crystal Palace, London – Joseph Paxton
- Houses of Parliament, London – Charles Barry, 1836 (98 proposals)
- Royal Courts of Justice, London – George Edmund Street, 1868 (11 competing architects)
- Kelvingrove Art Gallery, Glasgow – John William Simpson and E J Milner Allen, 1891 (19 competing architects)
- Liverpool Cathedral, Liverpool – Giles Gilbert Scott, 1902 (5 prequalified architects)
- McLeod Centre, Iona for the Iona Community – Feilden Clegg Bradley
- Manchester Art Gallery – Hopkins Architects, 1994 (132 entries)
- Scottish Parliament building, Edinburgh – Enric Miralles, 1998 (5 prequalified architects)
- National Assembly for Wales, Cardiff – Richard Rogers, 1998 (55 entries)

=== United States ===
- White House, Washington DC – James Hoban, 1792 (9 entries)
- 33 Liberty Street, New York – York and Sawyer, 1919
- Tribune Tower, Chicago – John Mead Howells and Raymond Hood, 1922 (260 entries)
- Boston City Hall, Boston – Kallmann McKinnell & Knowles, 1962 (national, 256 entries)
- McCormick Tribune Campus Center, Chicago – Rem Koolhaas, 1998
- New York World Trade Center
  - 2002 World Trade Center Master Design Contest – Daniel Libeskind (concept)
    - World Trade Center Site Memorial Competition – Michael Arad and Peter Walker
- Visual and Performing Arts Library, Brooklyn, NY – Enrique Norten / TEN Arquitectos

== Sources ==
- De Jong, Cees and Mattie, Erik: Architectural Competitions 1792–1949, Taschen, 1997, ISBN 3-8228-8599-1
- De Jong, Cees and Mattie, Erik: Architectural Competitions 1950-Today, Taschen, 1997, ISBN 3-8228-8900-8
