= Miralles Tagliabue =

Miralles Tagliabue may refer to:

- Enric Miralles
- Benedetta Tagliabue
