= Pedro López Jiménez =

Spanish businessman

- Born: Pedro Jose López Jiménez; 18 October 1942 (age 82); Málaga, Spain
- Education: IESE Business School
- Occupation: Businessman
- Title: Vice chairman, Real Madrid
- Term: 2009-
- Board member of: Real Madrid; ACS Group

Pedro Jose López Jiménez (born 18 October 1942) is a Spanish businessman, and the vice chairman of Real Madrid football club since 2009.

== Early life ==
Pedro López Jiménez was born on 18 October 1942. in Málaga. He earned a master's degree in civil engineering, and an MBA from IESE Business School.

== Career ==
López Jiménez was chairman of Unión Fenosa, a Spanish gas and electricity distribution company, now part of the Gas Natural group and previously, in the period 1979-1982 of the public owned electricity company Endesa.

López Jiménez has been the vice chairman of Real Madrid football club since 2009. He is a board member of the European Club Association (ECA).

He was appointed a member of the board of directors of ACS Group in June 1989 (re-appointed in 1994, 1999, 2003, 2008, 2015, and 2019).
