= Naturgy =

Spanish energy company

Naturgy Energy Group, S.A.

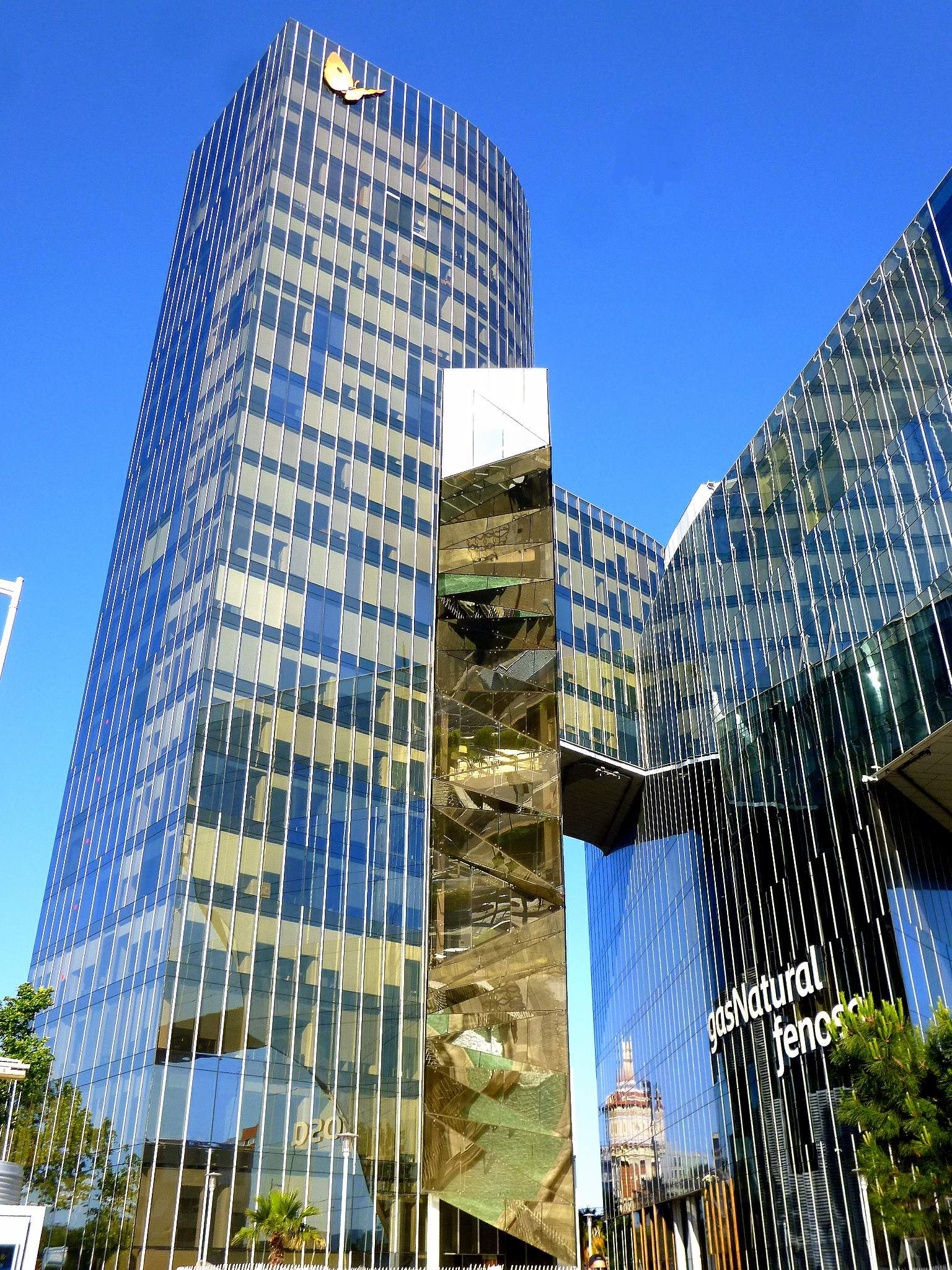
- Headquarters at Gas Natural Building, Barcelona
- Formerly: Gas Natural Fenosa, S.A.
- Type: Sociedad Anónima
- Traded as: BMAD: NTGY; IBEX 35
- ISIN: ES0116870314
- Industry: Natural gas utility
- Founded: 1991
- Headquarters: Avenida de América 38 (Madrid)
- Key people: Francisco Reynés (Chairman and CEO)
- Products: Supply, distribution and commercialisation of natural gas, electricity generation and distribution
- Revenue: ▲€23.306 billion (2017)
- Operating income: ▲€3.915 billion (2017)
- Net income: ▲€1.360 billion (2017)
- Total assets: ▲€47.322 billion (end 2010)
- Owner: CriteriaCaixa (28.5%)
- Number of employees: ▲18,780 (end 2010)
- Website: www.naturgy.com

Naturgy Energy Group S.A., formerly Gas Natural Fenosa (Spanish pronunciation: [ˈɡas natuˈɾal feˈnosa]), is a Spanish multinational natural gas and electrical energy utilities company, which operates primarily in Spain. The company's administrative headquarters are in Madrid.

It also has operations in other countries, including Italy, France, Germany, The Netherlands, Belgium, Mexico, Colombia, Panama, Argentina, Brazil, Moldova, and Morocco, as well as the U.S. territory of Puerto Rico.

== Description ==
The corporation's main interests are: the distribution of natural gas in Spain, Italy, and Latin America; the generation and commercialisation of electricity in the liberalised Spanish market (1997-2009); and the management of natural gas infrastructure and shipping transport.

Gas Natural has approximately 10,000,000 energy clients worldwide. It has around 6,700 employees, of which approximately 50% work within Spain.

The group's largest shareholders include the Spanish La Caixa bank and Repsol global energy company.

Gas Natural acquired utility company Unión Fenosa for around €16.8 billion in 2009.

In June 2018, the general shareholders meeting of Gas Natural approved the change of name of the company to Naturgy Energy Group.

=== Headquarters ===
Its legal headquarters were moved to Madrid in 2017, because of the Catalonia independence crisis. Currentlt, Naturgy's Madrid headquarter is located in the building located in Avenida de América 38, after selling the former Unión Fenosa's headquarters in Horteza>.

The main building of the former Gas Natural in Barvelona is the Gas Natural Building or Mare Nostrum Tower, located in the La Barceloneta neighbourhood of the Ciutat Vella district in Barcelona. The skyscraper was designed in the High-tech architectural style by the EMBT Architects firm of architects Enric Miralles and Benedetta Tagliabue, and was completed in 2005.

== See also ==
- EcoEléctrica in Puerto Rico — Gas Natural is the major shareholder.
