= Gas Natural Building =

Office skyscraper in Barcelona, Spain

Coordinates: 41.3835°N 2.1904°E

- Edificio Gas Natural
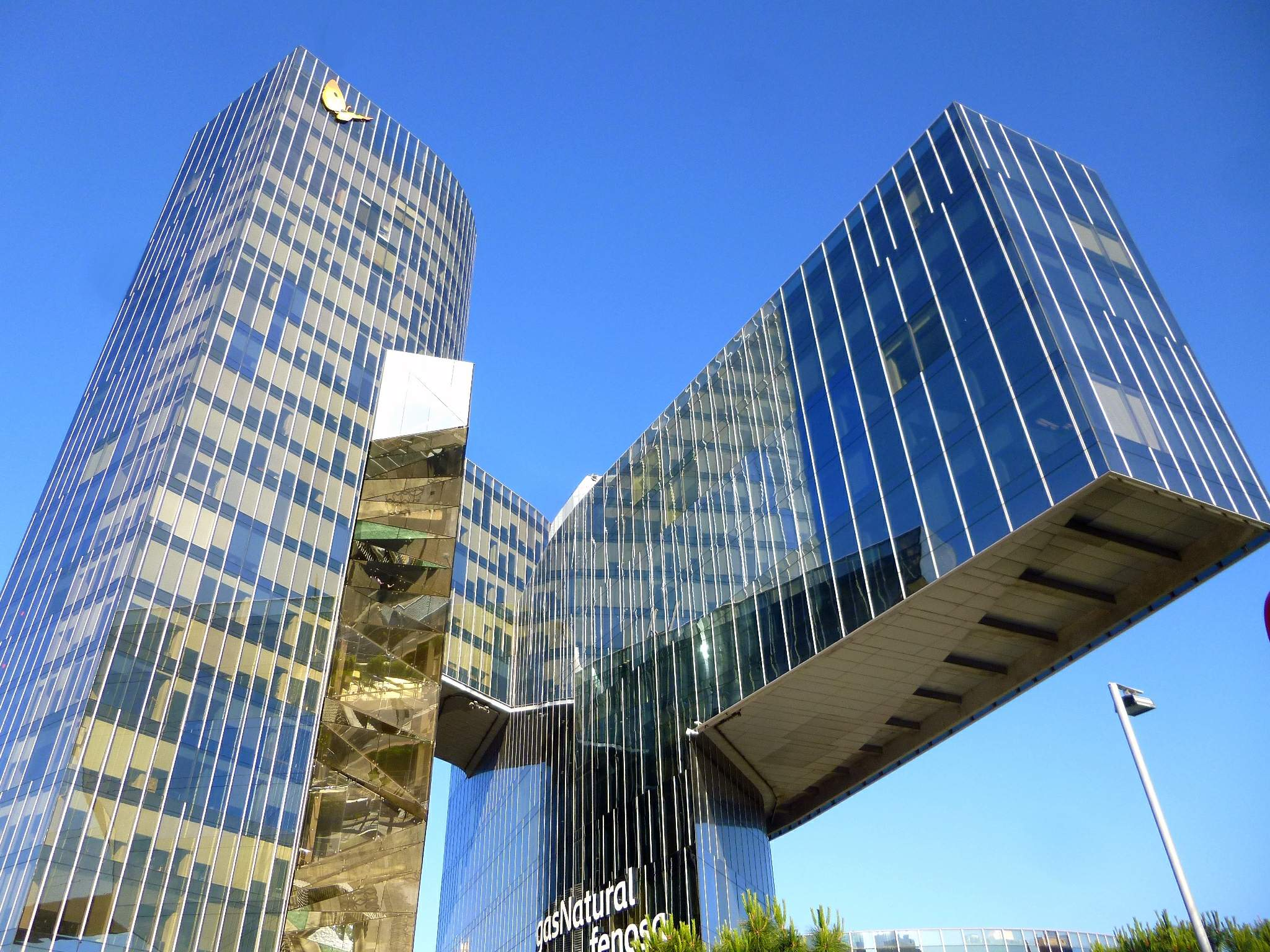
- Mare Nostrum Tower−Gas Natural Building
- Interactive map of the Gas Natural Building area

General information
- Type: office skyscraper
- Architectural style: High-tech
- Location: Barcelona, Catalonia, Spain
- Construction started: 2003
- Completed: 2005
- Owner: Inmobiliaria Colonial

Height
- Height: 86 m (282 ft)

Technical details
- Floor count: 20

Design and construction
- Architects: Enric Miralles & Benedetta Tagliabue

The Gas Natural Building, also known as Mare Nostrum Tower, is an office skyscraper located in the La Barceloneta neighbourhood of the Ciutat Vella district in Barcelona, Spain.

It was the headquarters building of the Spanish company Naturgy, formerly known as Gas Natural, until 2019 when the company's legal headquarters were moved to Madrid.

== Description ==
The Gas Natural Building was designed by the architects Enric Miralles and Benedetta Tagliabue in the high-tech architectural style. It was completed in 2005 and officially inaugurated in 2008.

It has 20 floors, and rises 86 m (282 ft). It has an innovative and distinctive image, as the building has two lower horizontal glazed blocks protruding and cantilevered out from the main tower.

It is located near the seafront, and to the southwest of two other La Barceloneta skyscrapers, the Hotel Arts and the Torre Mapfre.

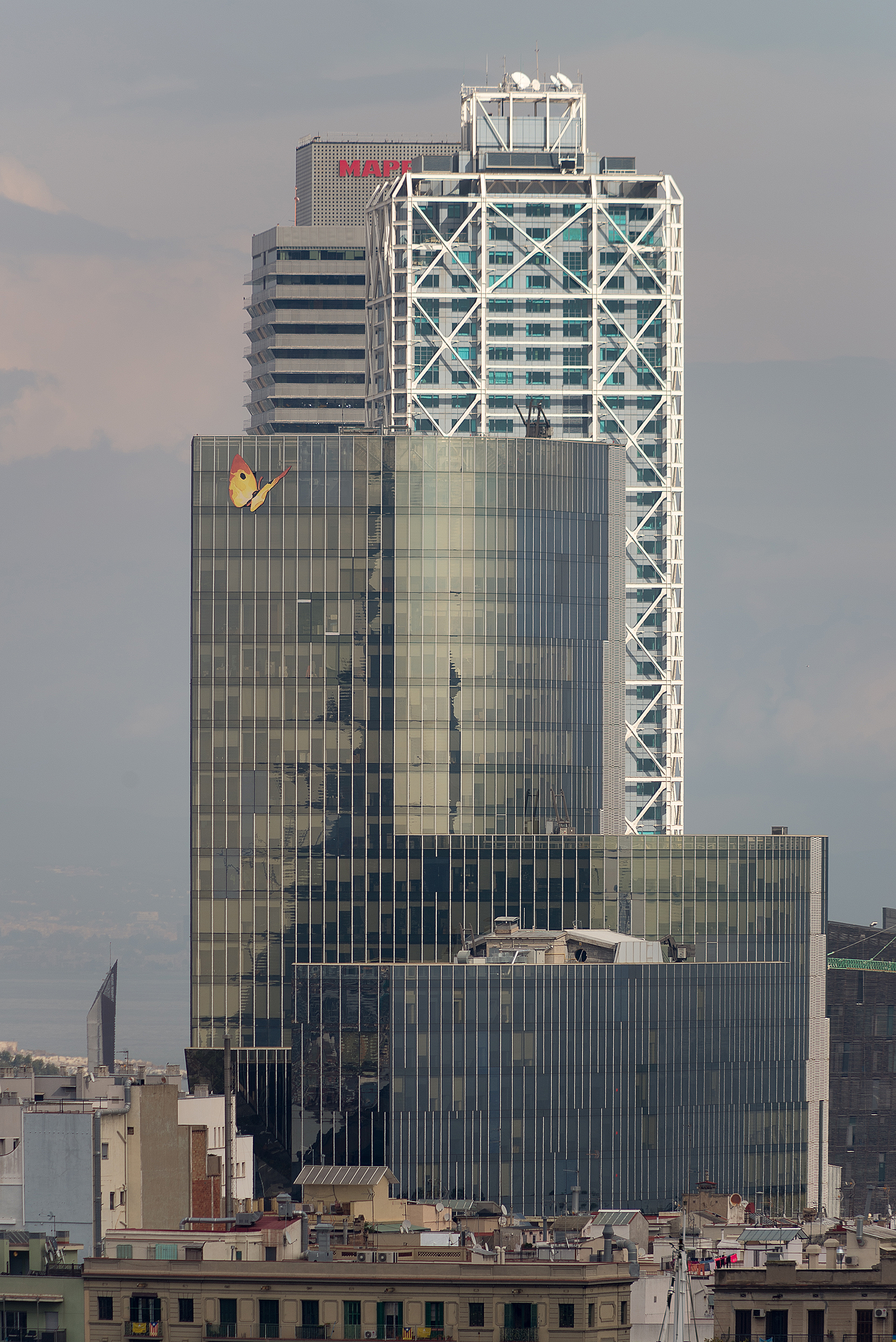
Gas Natural Building (with flame logo) and adjacent towers in La Barceloneta.

In 2019, Naturgy sold the Mare Nostrum Tower to Inmobiliaria Colonial.

== See also ==
- List of tallest buildings and structures in Barcelona
- Skyscraper office buildings in Barcelona
