= Unión Fenosa =

Unión Fenosa, S.A.
- Traded as: BMAD: UNF
- Industry: Energy
- Predecessor: Unión Eléctrica
- Founded: Madrid, Spain (November 23, 1982)
- Defunct: 2009
- Successor: Gas Natural Fenosa, now Naturgy
- Key people: Pedro López Jiménez, Chairman; Honorato López Isla, CEO
- Revenue: € 7,189 million (2008)
- Operating income: € 1,675 million (2008)
- Net income: ▲€1,194 million (2008)
- Number of employees: 12,780 (2008)
- Website: www.unionfenosa.es

Unión Fenosa, S.A. was, until its acquisition by Gas Natural in 2009, a large Spanish company dedicated to the production and distribution of gas and electricity.

It installed capacity of 11,120 megawatts of power and 8.9 million customers. The headquarters were in Madrid and the chairman was Pedro López Jiménez. Formerly a constituent of the IBEX 35 index, the company is a part of the Naturgy Energy Group.

== History ==
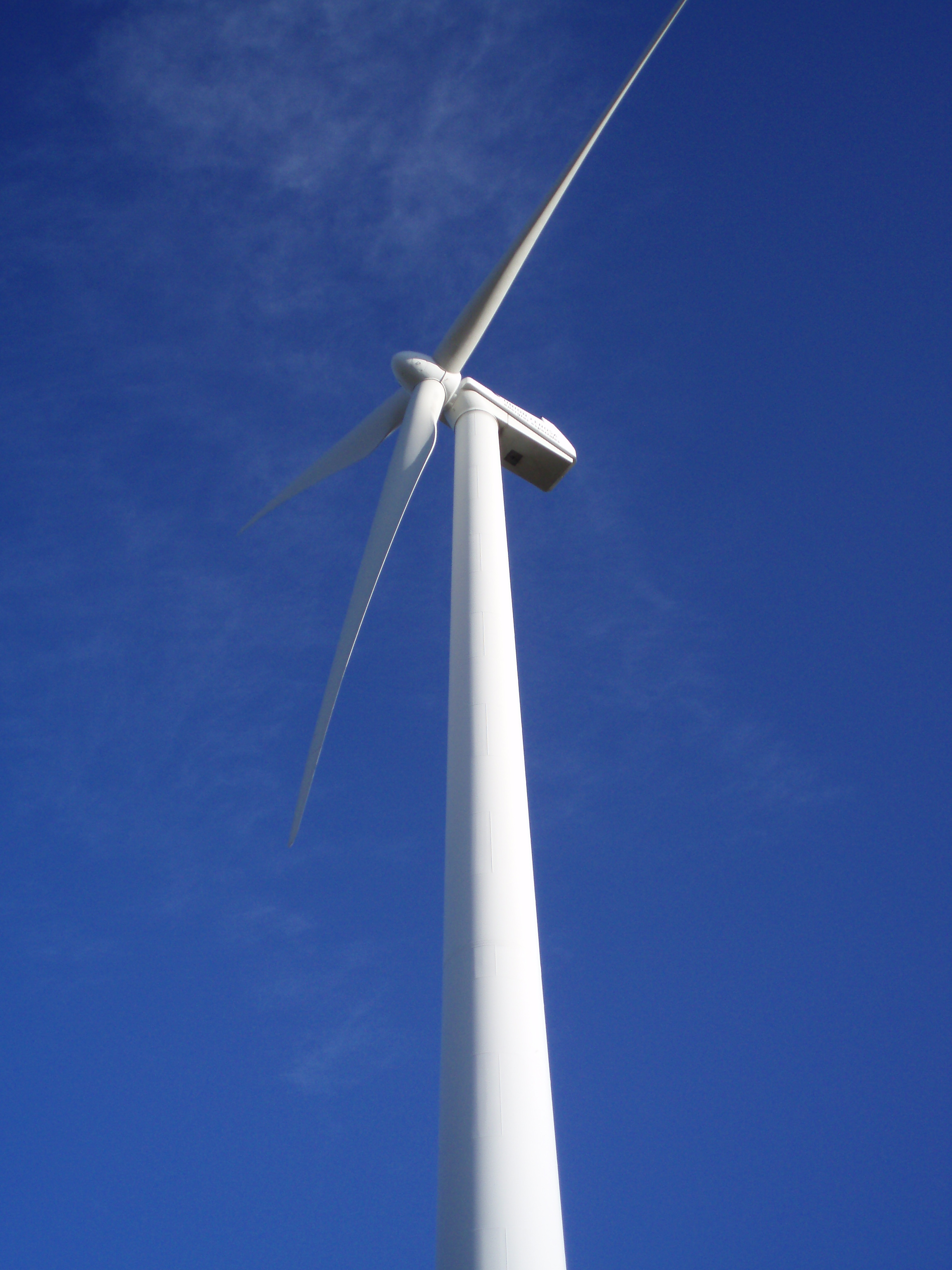
Unión Fenosa´s aerogenerator

The company was founded in 1912 as Unión Eléctrica Madrileña and it traded under that name until 1970 when the name was changed to Unión Eléctrica. In 1982 it merged with Fuerza Eléctrica de Noroeste, S.A. (Fenosa) to form Unión Eléctrica Fenosa. In 2000 the name was shortened to Unión Fenosa. In 2008 the company was acquired by the Gas Natural group.

=== Carbon intensity ===
Year	Production (TWh)	Emission (Gt CO_{2})	kg CO_{2}/MWh
2002	24	16.38	683
2003	26	15.1	584
2004	27	16.54	612
2005	29	16.49	572
2006	31	15.82	514
2007	34	18.2	535
2008	18	7.26	398
2009	29	9.48	330

== Structure ==
The company had the following businesses:

- Domestic generation and marketing
- Domestic distribution
- Gas
- International electrical business
- Other interests
  - Indra (11%)

== Shareholders ==
Prior to 2008 around 45% of the shares were owned by Grupo ACS. In July 2008, Gas Natural agreed to buy Grupo ACS's stake worth €7.6 billion.
