= Enric Miralles =

Spanish architect (1955–2000)

- Miralles, c. 2000
- Born: 12 February 1955; Barcelona, Spain
- Died: 3 July 2000 (aged 45); Sant Feliu de Codines, Spain
- Occupation: Architect
- Awards: Madrid City Prize (1993); Spanish Architecture Award (1995); Golden Lion (1996); Stirling Prize (2005)
- Practice: Piñon-Viaplana; Miralles + Pinós; EMBT
- Buildings: Scottish Parliament Building; Igualada Cemetery

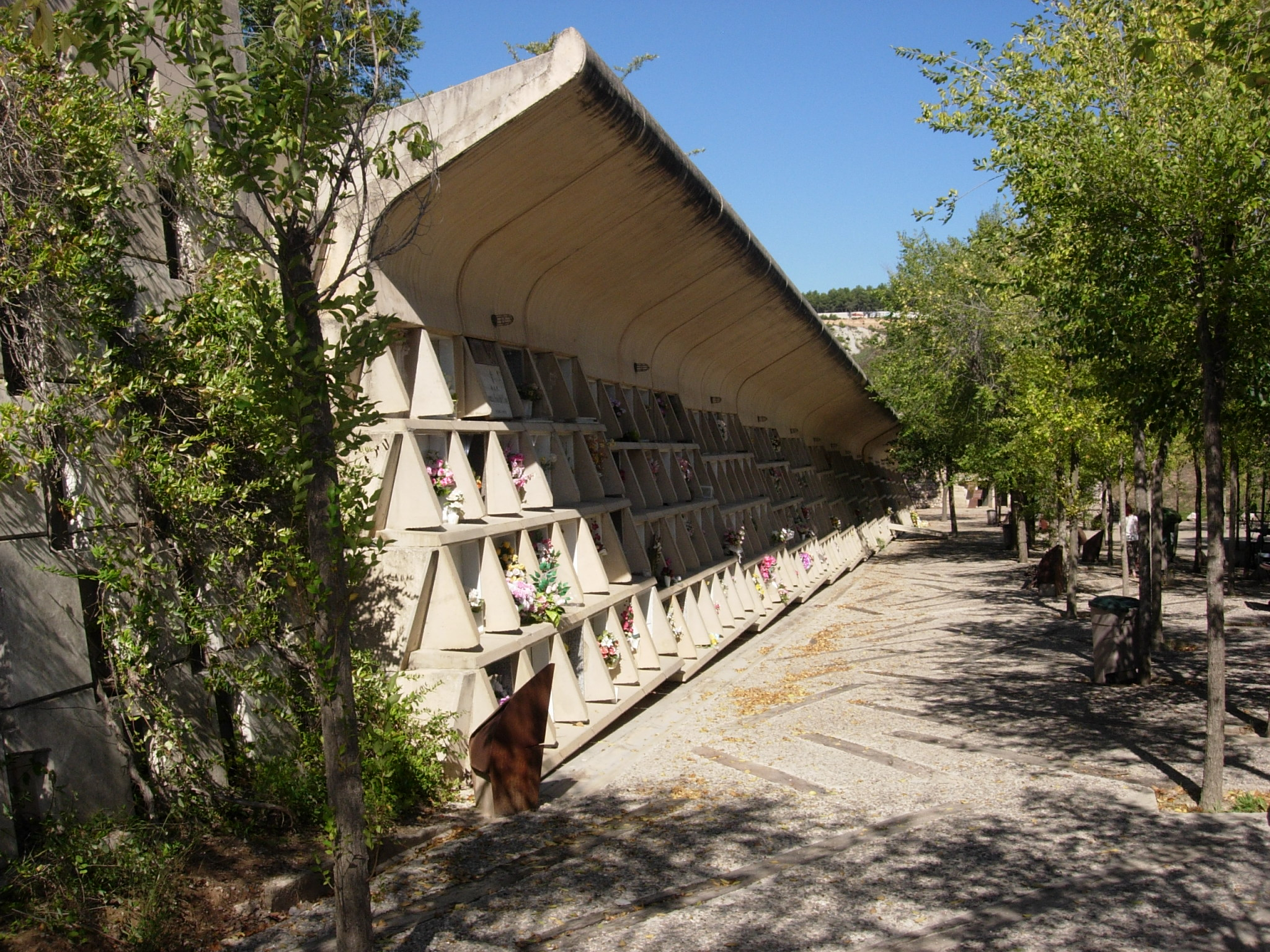
Igualada Cemetery

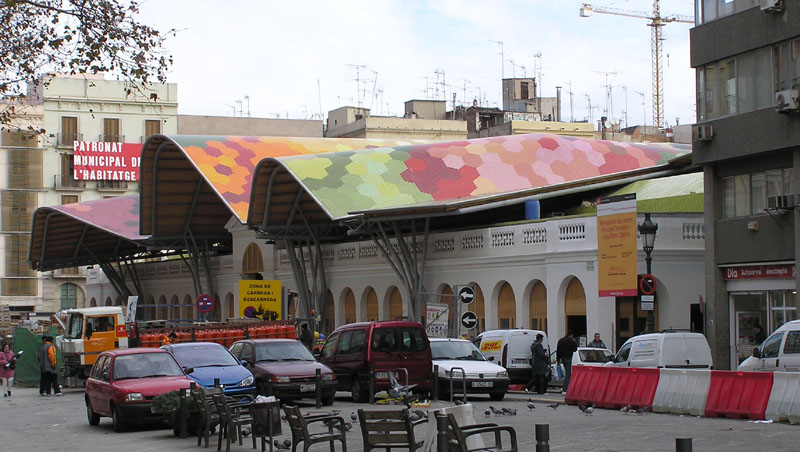
Santa Caterina Market

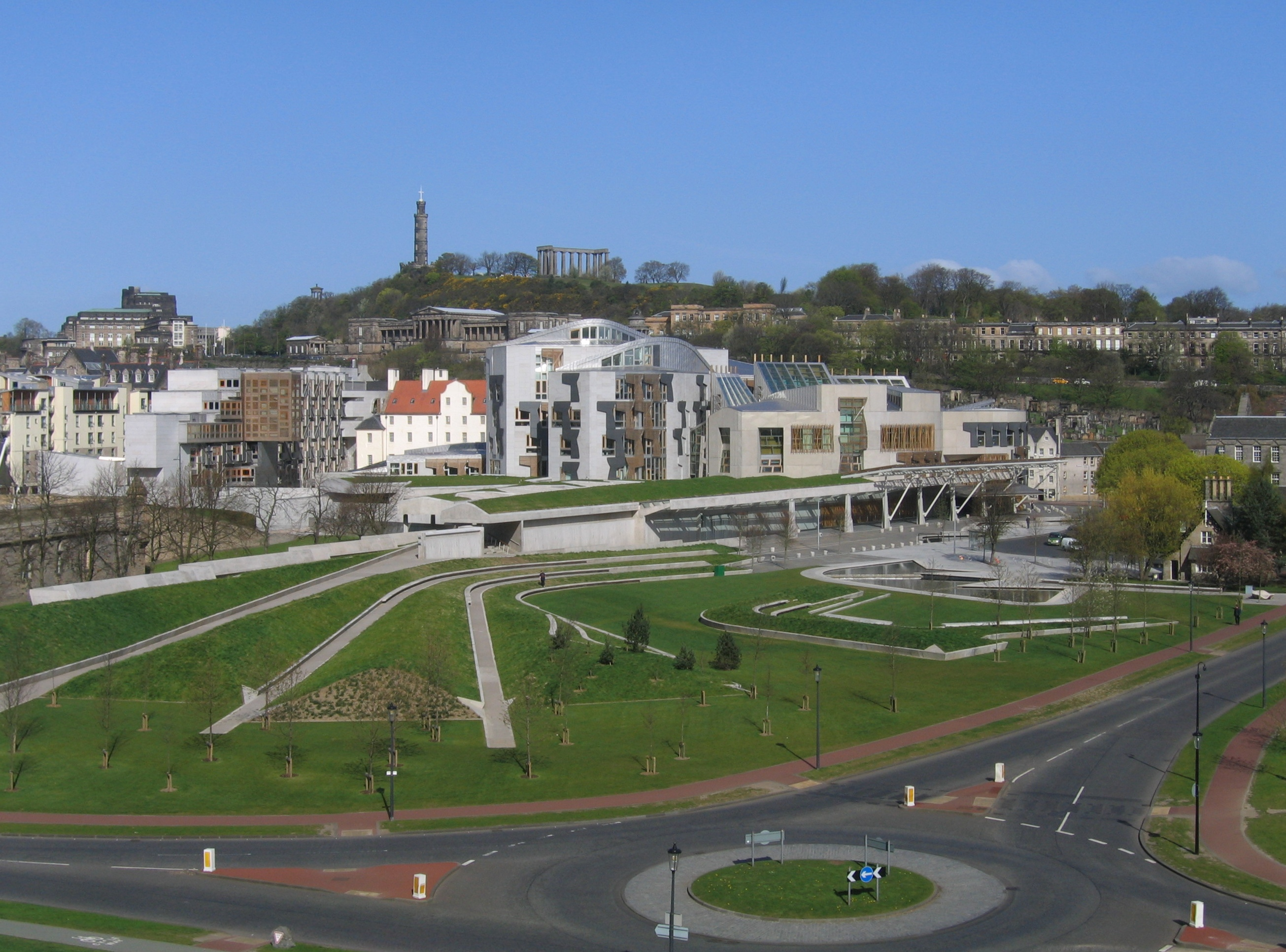
Exterior view of the Scottish Parliament Building in Edinburgh

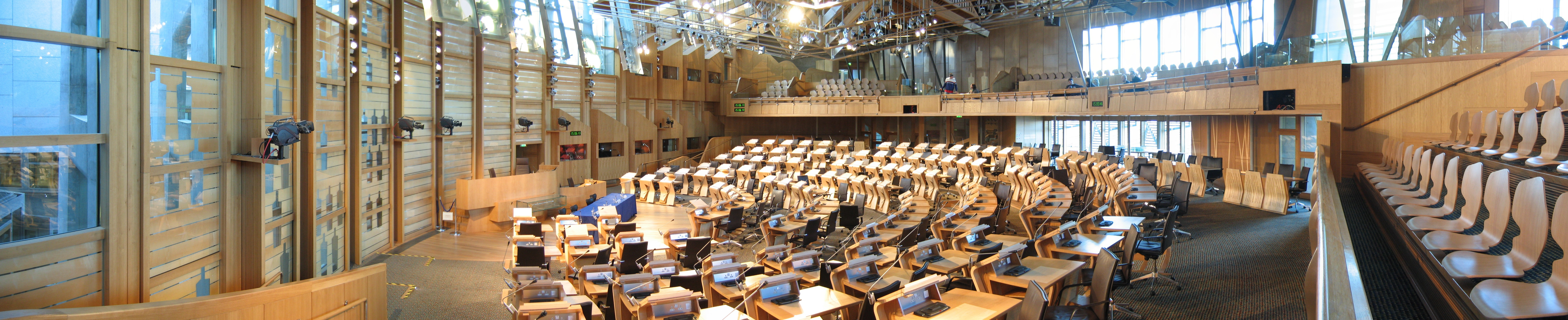
Debating chamber of the Scottish Parliament

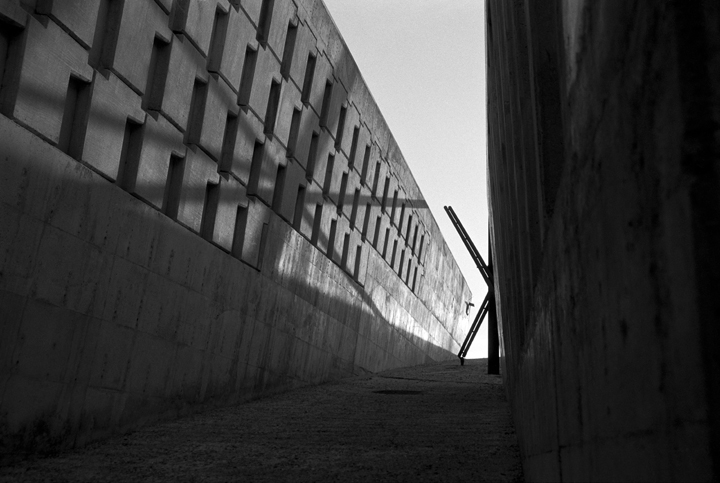
Igualada Cemetery (Cementiri Nou), 1993 - View towards entrance

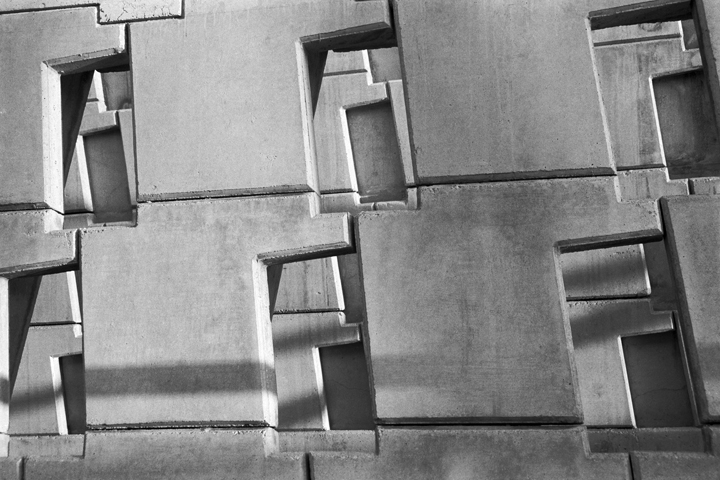
Igualada Cemetery (Cementiri Nou), Fall 1993 - View of precast concrete screens

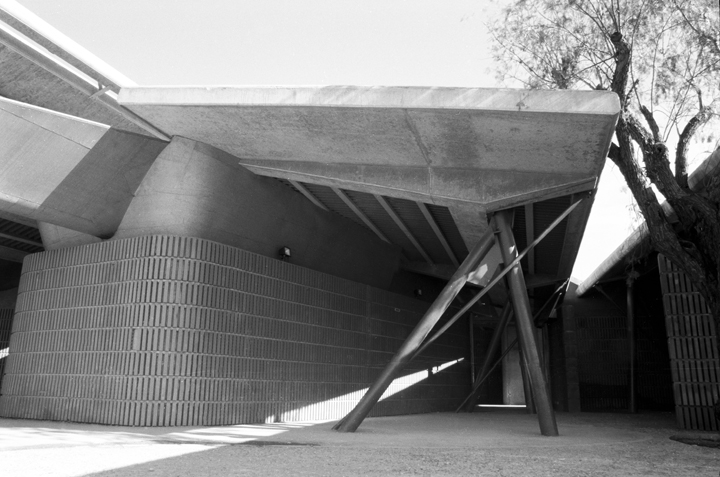
Archery Pavilion, 1992 - View of precast roof elements at change rooms

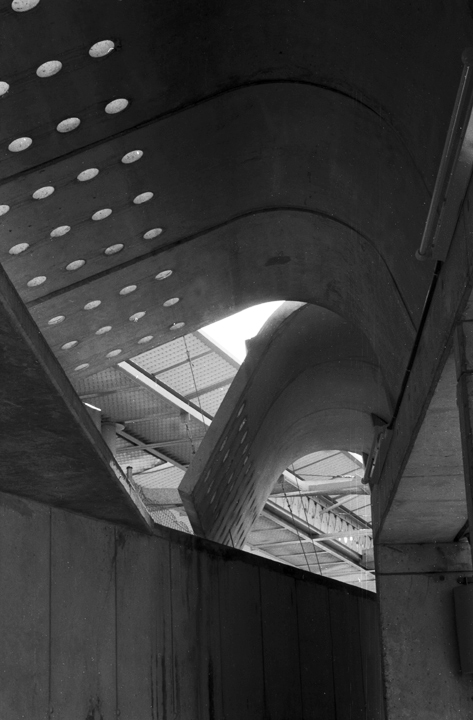
Archery Pavilion, 1992

Enric Miralles Moya (12 February 1955 – 3 July 2000) was a Spanish architect from Barcelona. He graduated from the Barcelona School of Architecture (ETSAB) at the Polytechnic University of Catalonia (UPC) in 1978. After establishing his reputation with a number of collaborations with his first wife Carme Pinós; the couple separated in 1991. Miralles later married fellow architect Benedetta Tagliabue, and the two practiced together as EMBT Architects. Miralles' largest and most controversial project, the Scottish Parliament Building, was unfinished at the time of his death.

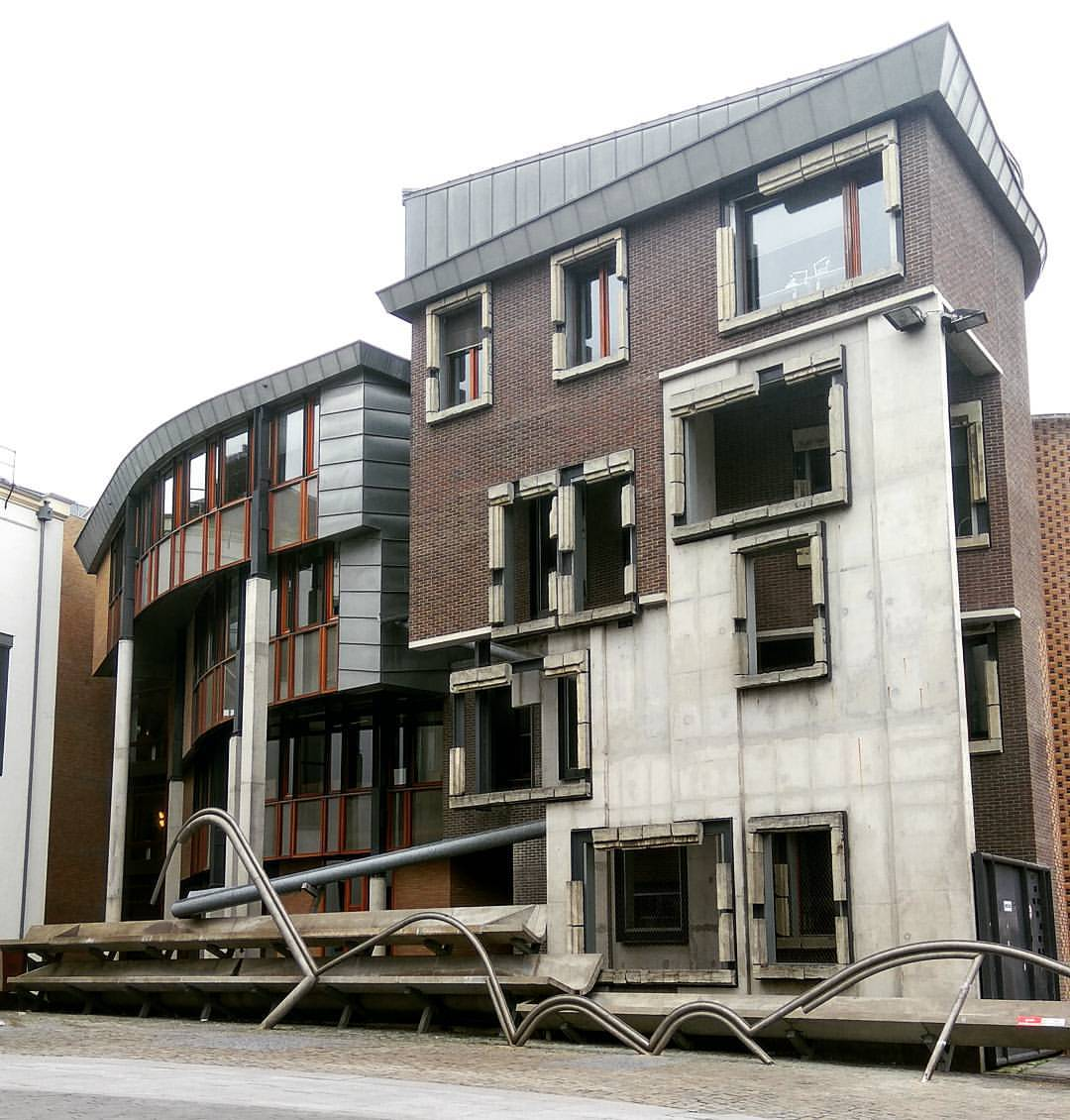
Town hall (extension), Utrecht

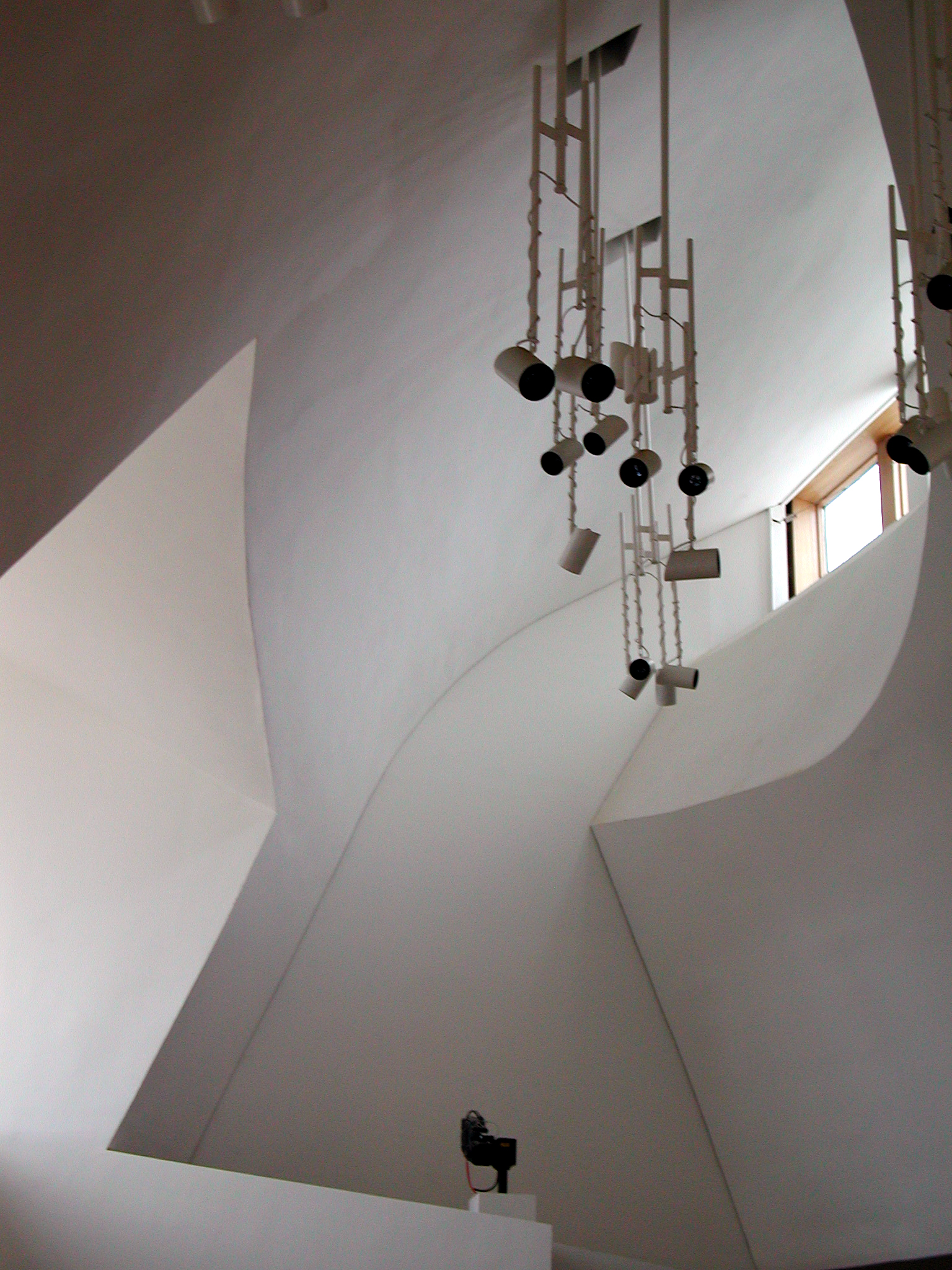
The Scottish Parliament Building committee room ceiling

== Life ==
In 1978, Miralles completed his examinations at the Escola Tècnica Superior d'Arquitectura (ETSAB) in Barcelona. From 1973 to 1978, he worked in the architect's office of Albert Viaplana and Helio Piñón. Whilst there—among other things—he was involved in the construction of the Plaça dels Països Catalans, the forecourt for the Estació de Sants. In 1984, after several architectural competition awards, Miralles formed his own office in Barcelona with his first wife Carme Pinós, which they led together until 1991. Within the rising Spanish architecture scene of the late 1980s following the death of Francisco Franco, their unusual buildings attracted international attention. As a result, they received numerous commissions from Spain and overseas. After their separation, Miralles and Pinós continued to work in separate offices.

In 1993, Miralles formed a new practice with his second wife, the Italian architect Benedetta Tagliabue, under the name "EMBT Architects". She resumed the practice under his name after his death. The most important projects; the Scottish Parliament Building in Edinburgh and the multistoried building for the Spanish gas company Gas Natural in Barcelona, were only finished after his death. Miralles died at the age of 45 as the result of a brain tumor.

== Architecture ==
The independent architectural language of Miralles can be difficult to classify in terms of contemporary architecture. It is influenced by Spanish architects, such as Alejandro de la Sota, José Antonio Coderch and Josep Maria Jujol, and also from international greats such as Le Corbusier, Louis Kahn and Alvar Aalto and the Russian Constructivist movement of the early 20th century. The freely formed buildings utilising massive building materials and steel, develop from their relationship with the environment and connect themselves to it. The form is constructed using often unusual materials which are generally left with natural surfaces. Form and material interpret the place, traditions and history in a personal and poetic art, as his critics attest. From the starting point of the townscape or landscape he would design a building in its totality, down to the details of the furnishing and the exterior installations. Therefore, the execution of the details was just as important to the communication of meaning as the main form. Both were developed over a large number of designs and with numerous models as the main tool of the design process.

Charles Jencks, writing on the problems surrounding the construction of the Scottish Parliament Building and the controversial reception of its design for Architecture Today, summed up Miralles' architectural style:

Miralles, like many other postmodern architects, has a preference for piling on the motifs and ideas: upturned boats, keel shapes, deep window reveals like a castle, crow-steps, prow shapes, diagonal gutters, 'bamboo bundles' and above all the dark granite gun-shape that repeats as an ornamental motif at a huge scale. Everywhere broken silhouettes compete for attention, just like the alleyways next door. That's fine, and contextual, but it's quite a meal. As a result of the complexity, the parliament is really a kind of small city, with much too much to digest in one short three-hour sitting. The Scottish parliament will take time to judge: maybe not 50 years but three or four visits, long enough to absorb all the richness and get used to those jumpy black granite guns, the most arbitrary of several questionable ornaments.

== Academia ==
Miralles was an active teacher at numerous universities. In 1985, he became a professor at the ETSAB in Barcelona. During 1990, he took over the conceptional design chair at the Städelschule in Frankfurt am Main. In 1993, Miralles received an invitation from Harvard University to occupy the Kenzo Tange chair. He taught as a guest lecturer at Columbia University in New York, Princeton University in New Jersey, the Architectural Association in London, the Berlage Instituut in Rotterdam, the Mackintosh School of Architecture in Glasgow and the Universities of Buenos Aires and Mexico City.

== Work ==
=== Buildings ===
In Partnership with Carme Pinós

- 1984 to 1986 La Llauna School, Badalona, Barcelona
- 1985 Canopy for the Plaça Major, Parets del Vallès
- 1985 to 1994 Igualada Cemetery, Igualada, Barcelona. 41º35'31"N 1º38'14"E
- 1986 to 1992 Hostalets de Balenyà Civic Centre, Barcelona
- 1986 to 1993 Boarding school in Morella, Castelló
- 1987 to 1993 La Mina Civic Centre, Sant Adrià de Besòs, Barcelona
- 1988 to 1992 House, Bellaterra, Barcelona
- 1989/91 Olympic archery range for the 1992 Summer Olympics, Vall d'Hebrón, Barcelona
- 1988 to 1992 Sportcentre in Huesca
- 1990/91 Centre for rhythmic gymnastics, Alicante
- 1990 to 1992 Pergola for the Passeig Nova Icària, Olympic village, Barcelona

In Partnership with Benedetta Tagliabue

- 1991 to 2001 Park Santa Rosa, Mollet del Vallés
- 1995 House conversion in Barcelona
- 1996 Small House for a Kolonihaven
- 1996 to 2000 Six houses, Amsterdam, Netherlands
- 1997 to 2000 Parc de Diagonal Mar, Barcelona
- 1997 to 2000 Utrecht town hall extension, Netherlands
- 1997 to 2001 Library in Palafolls, Barcelona
- 1997 to 2001 Santa Caterina Market hall conversion, Barcelona
- 1998 to 2000 Extension of the national youth school of music, Hamburg
- 1998 to 2002 Scottish Parliament Building in Edinburgh, Scotland. 55º57'7"N 03º10'29"W
- 1999 Maretas Museum, Lanzarote
- 1999 to 2006 Torre Mare Nostrum, Head office of Gas Natural, Barcelona
- 2002 Public space design Western Hafencity Hamburg
- 2000 to 2005 New building of the architecture faculty, Venice, Italy

=== Projects ===
==== In partnership with Carme Pinós ====
- 1985/86 Bridge in Lérida
- 1987 El Vapor Vell house, Barcelona
- 1988 Street canopies for the Expo 1992, Seville
- 1988 House in Gerona
- 1989 to 1992 Promenade in Reus, Tarragona

==== In partnership with Benedetta Tagliabue ====
- 1993 Old Port Redevelopment competition, Bremerhaven, Germany
- 1995 Chemnitz Stadium
- 1995 Dresden Stadium
- 1995 Laboratory building for the University of Dresden
- 1995 Tram stop in Frankfurt am Main
- 1996 Japanese National Library, Tokyo, Japan
- 1996 Auditorium for the University of Lübeck
- 1997 Pier in Thessaloniki, Greece
- 1998 San Michele Cemetery extension competition, Venice, Italy
- 1999 Law courts competition in Salerno, Italy
- 1999 University campus Vigo, Pontevedra
- 2000 Wolfsburg Science Center competition
- 2001 Competition for the head office of the California Department of Transportation, Los Angeles, US
- 2007 Enric Miralles Public Library in Palafolls, Gerona

=== Furniture ===
- The Sentada chair for Artespaña
- 1993 The Iñes Table – designed for a project in Grenoble – a multi-use piece of furniture accommodating a variety of working and storage requirements.

== Awards ==
- 1985 FAD-Prize (Foment Arts Decoratives)
- 1992 FAD-Prize (Foment Arts Decoratives)
- 1995 Spanish Architecture Award
- 1996 "Golden Lion" from the Venice Biennale
- 2002 Netherlands "Bouwprijs"
- 2005 RIBA Stirling Prize for the Scottish Parliament Building

== Bibliography ==
- Enric Miralles, Something seen at right and left (without glasses), 1983 (PhD thesis – the title refers to Erik Satie's Choses vues à droite et à gauche)
- El Croquis 30+49 / 50 Omnibus Volume. Enric Miralles / Carme Pinos: obra construita / built works 1983–1994. Madrid: El Croquis, 1995.
- Miralles, E.; Taliabue, B. (2004). EMBT Enric Miralles, Bernadetta Tagliabue, Work in Progress (Paperback) (in English and Catalan). Barcelona: Col-legi d'Arquitectes de Catalunya Publications.
- Zabalbeascoa, Anatxu (1996). Igualada Cemetery: Enric Miralles and Carme Pinos (Architecture in Detail) [Barcelona 1986 – 90; architects: Enric Miralles and Carme Pinós, 1986 competition project; Enric Miralles, 1987 – 90 project and construction]. London: Phaidon Press. ISBN 0-7148-3281-2.
- Herrero Delicado, Gonzalo (2008). "A building that talks with the sea", A10 new European architecture No. 21, "Section: Beyond transparency" p. 57. Amsterdam: A10 Media BV.
