= Albert Viaplana =

Spanish architect and author

Albert Viaplana (c. 1933 – 16 May 2014) was a Spanish architect and author. He is known for creating the Centre de Cultura Contemporània de Barcelona (CCCB), the Plaça de Sants and dock Xoan XXIII Avenue of Santiago de Compostela. He won many awards during his career. His career spanned nearly 50 years.

Viaplana died in Barcelona, Spain, aged 81.
