= Igualada Cemetery =

Cemetery in Igualada, near Barcelona, Catalonia, Spain

Coordinates: 41°35′31″N 1°38′14″E

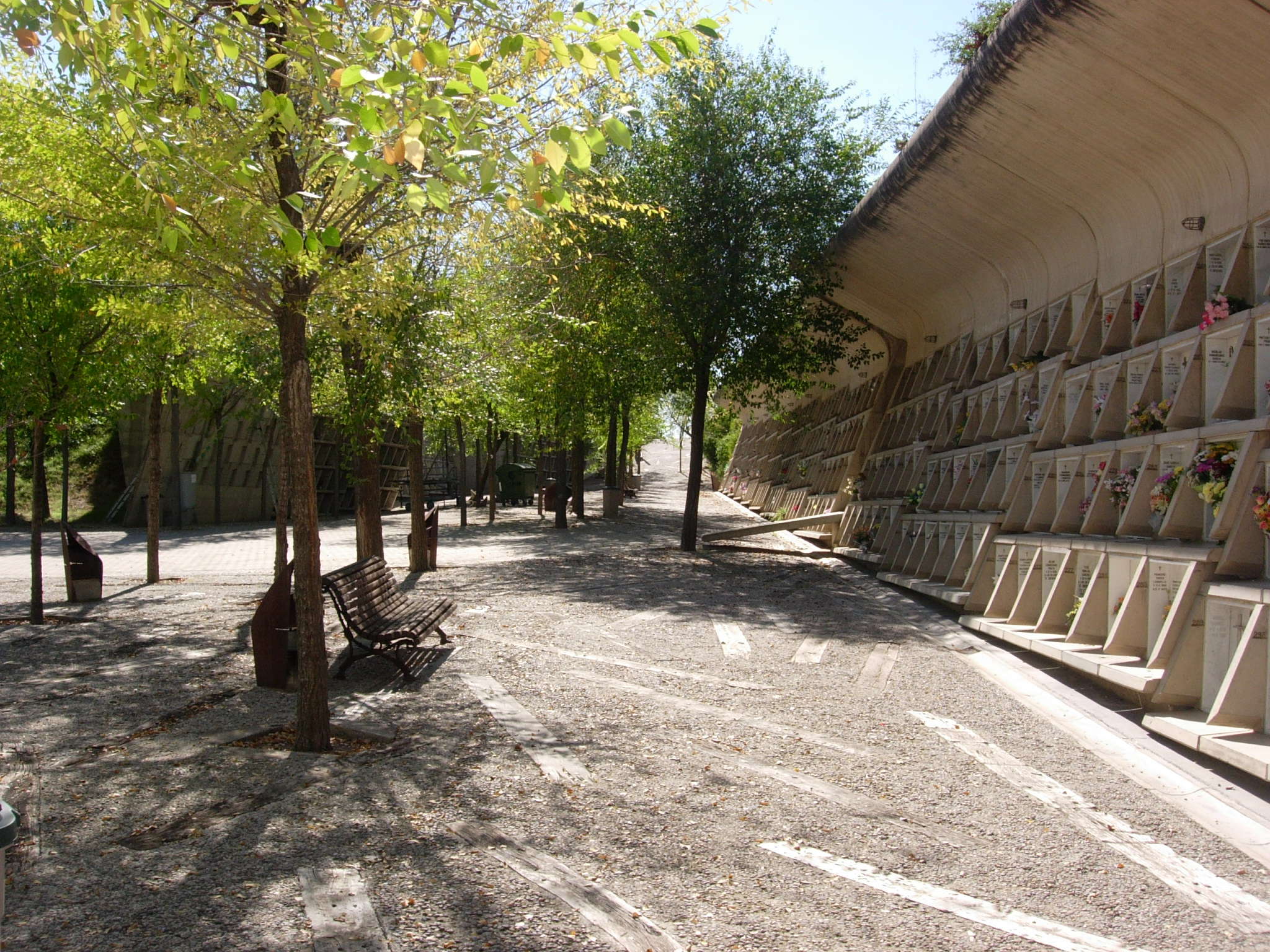

Igualada Cemetery or New Cemetery (Catalan: Cementiri Nou) is a cemetery in Igualada, near Barcelona, Catalonia, Spain, designed by the architects Enric Miralles and Carme Pinós after winning an architectural competition in 1984. Constructed between 1985 and 1994 as a replacement for the Old Cemetery (Catalan: "Cementiri Vell"), the cemetery became widely regarded as one of the most poetic works of twentieth century Catalan architecture. Enric Miralles, who died in the year 2000 is buried in one of the tombs.

== Architectural concept ==
Miralles and Pinós were concerned, not just to design a cemetery, but to explore poetic ideas regarding the acceptance of the cycle of life to enable a link between the past, the present, and the future.

The project is conceived, in part, as an earthwork that transforms the surrounding landscape and also, in part, as a metaphor for the river of life. A processional "street" descends from the entrance, where crossed, rusting, steel poles doubling as gates and likened to the crosses at Calvary, proclaim the start of a winding pathway towards the burial area. The route is lined with repeatable concrete loculi forming retaining walls and the floor of the path has railway sleepers set into its concrete surface. The intention was to bring the bereaved down into the landscape to a 'city of the dead', an in between place where the dead and the living are brought closer together. The spaces are designed to provoke thoughts and memories.

== Critique and influence ==
Zabalbeascoa sees Miralles's work in general, and the cemetery in particular, as being architecture "which 'naturally' adapts itself to a given site" but cannot be termed simply organic architecture. His work is "more than simply interpreting the programme [brief] or observing a site's geographical landscape, however attentively, his architecture explores pre-existing traces in the cultural landscape of each project." The cemetery can thus be considered as architecture of the land that involves a humanisation of the brief and appreciation of the topography - that is, the visible, physical land as well as the memories contained within it. This is seen by Zabalbeascoa in contrast to the particular form of critical regionalism which prevailed in the Spanish architectural scene of the 1970s which had tended towards a more sentimental or scenographic type of architecture.

"What sort of cultural landscape is it, in other words, that takes up sides with nature against the monumentalist enterprise of culture, especially when it was suppose [sic] to offer visitors an intimation of immortality? ......[it is] one that redefines the terms, such that nature is no longer understood as the unproblematic opposite of culture, death no longer the mere antithesis of life."

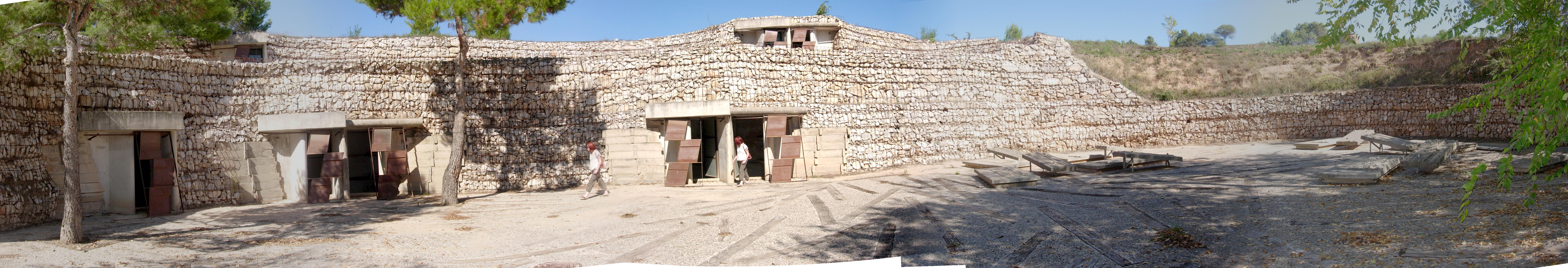

== Notes ==
El libro "100 edificios del siglo XX", un proyecto llevado a cabo para The Now Institute, un centro de investigación asociado a la Universidad de Los Ángeles (UCLA) y que en España ha publicado la editorial Gustavo Gili, ha reunido a 50 de los mejores y más renombrados arquitectos del momento para pedirles su selección de las obras más relevantes de la arquitectura moderna. Le mostramos aquí, con un interior y un exterior, que es como hay que ver la arquitectura, las 20 primeras del ranking, y 'colamos' una más, la que ocupa el puesto 49, ya que se trata de la primera obra del listado proyectada por un arquitecto español. Se trata del Cementerio de Igualada de Enric Miralles y Carmen Pinós, en el puesto 49.
