= Carme Pinós =

Spanish architect (born 1954)

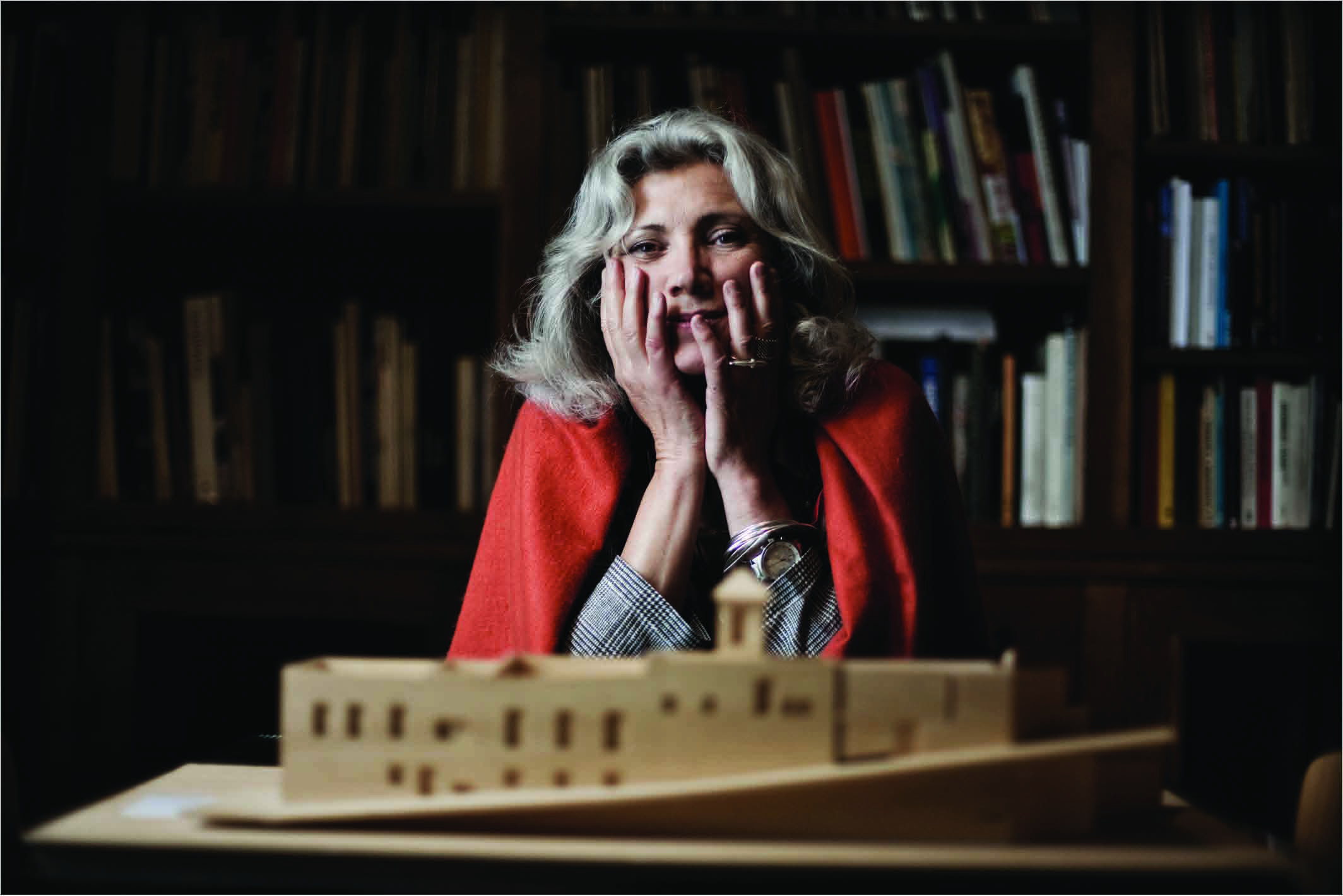
- Born: 1954 (age 71–72); Barcelona, Spain
- Education: ETSAB, Barcelona School of Architecture
- Occupation: Architect
- Awards: 2007 First Prize of the IX Biennial of Spanish Architecture
- Practice: Estudio Carme Pinós
- Buildings: Cube Tower; Igualada Cemetery; Olympic archery range, Barcelona

Carme Pinós Desplat (born 1954) is a Spanish architect.

== Biography ==
Pinós graduated Escuela Técnica Superior de Arquitectura de Barcelona (ETSAB) in Barcelona in 1979 and returned to the school in 1981 to study Urbanism. From 1982 on she formed a partnership with her husband, Enric Miralles, which ended in 1991. During this period the projects developed include the Igualada Cemetery Park, the Archery Range Buildings for the 1992 Summer Olympic Games and the La Llauna School in Badalona. The work of Pinós-Miralles received awards on several occasions, including the FAD prize for the La Llauna School and the Igualada Cemetery Park, as well as the City of Barcelona Prize for the 1992 Olympic Archery Range Buildings.

In 1991 Pinós set up her own studio and transferred the supervision and construction of several projects initiated in her previous office. Amongst them was the Community Centre and Auditorium in Hostalets de Balanya, La Mina Community Centre and the Boarding School in Morella. Since then she has combined her activity as an architect with teaching, working as a guest professor, amongst others, at the University of Illinois at Urbana-Champaign (1994–1995), the Kunstakademie Düsseldorf (1996–1997), the Columbia University in New York (1999), the Ecole Polytechnique Fédérale of Lausanne (2001–2002), the ETSAB in Barcelona (2002), the Università Degli Studi di Sassari in Alghero (2002–2004), the Harvard University Graduate School of Design (2003) and at the Accademia di Archittetura di Mendrisio in Switzerland (2005–2006).

Notable projects during her career include the Pedestrian Bridge in Petrer (Alicante), the Juan Aparicio Waterfront in Torrevieja (Alicante), the La Serra High School in Mollerussa, the Ses Estacions Park and the Espanya Square in Palma de Mallorca, the Cube Tower in Guadalajara, Jalisco (Mexico), and the Primary School in Castelldefels (Barcelona). More recent projects include the Novoli housing complex in Florence, the Catalan Government Headquarters in Tortosa, a high school in Sant Carles de la Ràpita and an office building in Igualada. Pinós designed the Gardunya Square in Barcelona, as well as two adjacent buildings, a housing building and the Massana Fine Arts School.

Pinós's work has been exhibited at several galleries, museums and universities, including the Kunstakademie in Stuttgart (1995), the Architektur-Hochschule in Aachen (1995), the University of Illinois at Urbana-Champaign (1994), the AAM Gallery in Rome (1996), the Urania Gallery in Barcelona (1996), the Eight Plan Gallery in New York, the Contemporary Art Museum of Puerto Rico (1997), the COAM Foundation of Madrid (1997) and the Colleges of Architects of Ibiza (1996), Valencia and Galicia (1997) and the Spanish Pavilion in the Venice Architecture Biennale (2006). Since 2006 the model of the Cube Tower is part of the permanent collection of the MOMA.

== Work ==
=== In partnership with Enric Miralles ===
- 1984 to 1986 La Llauna Factory School, Badalona
- 1985 Canopy for the Plaza Mayor, Parets de Vallés
- 1985 to 1994 Igualada Cemetery, Igualada
- 1986 to 1992 Hostalets de Balenya Civic Centre, Barcelona
- 1986 to 1993 Boarding school in Morella
- 1987 to 1993 La Mina Civic Centre, Sant Adrià de Besòs, Barcelona
- 1988 to 1992 House, Bellaterra, Barcelona
- 1989/91 Olympic archery range for the 1992 Summer Olympics, Valle de Hebrón, Barcelona.41°25′31.53″N 02°08′41.51″E
- 1988 to 1992 Sportcentre in Huesca
- 1990/91 Centre for rhythmic gymnastics, Alicante
- 1990 to 1992 pagoda for the Paseo Icario, Olympic village, Barcelona
- 1992 Corbetes Avda, Icaria, Barcelona

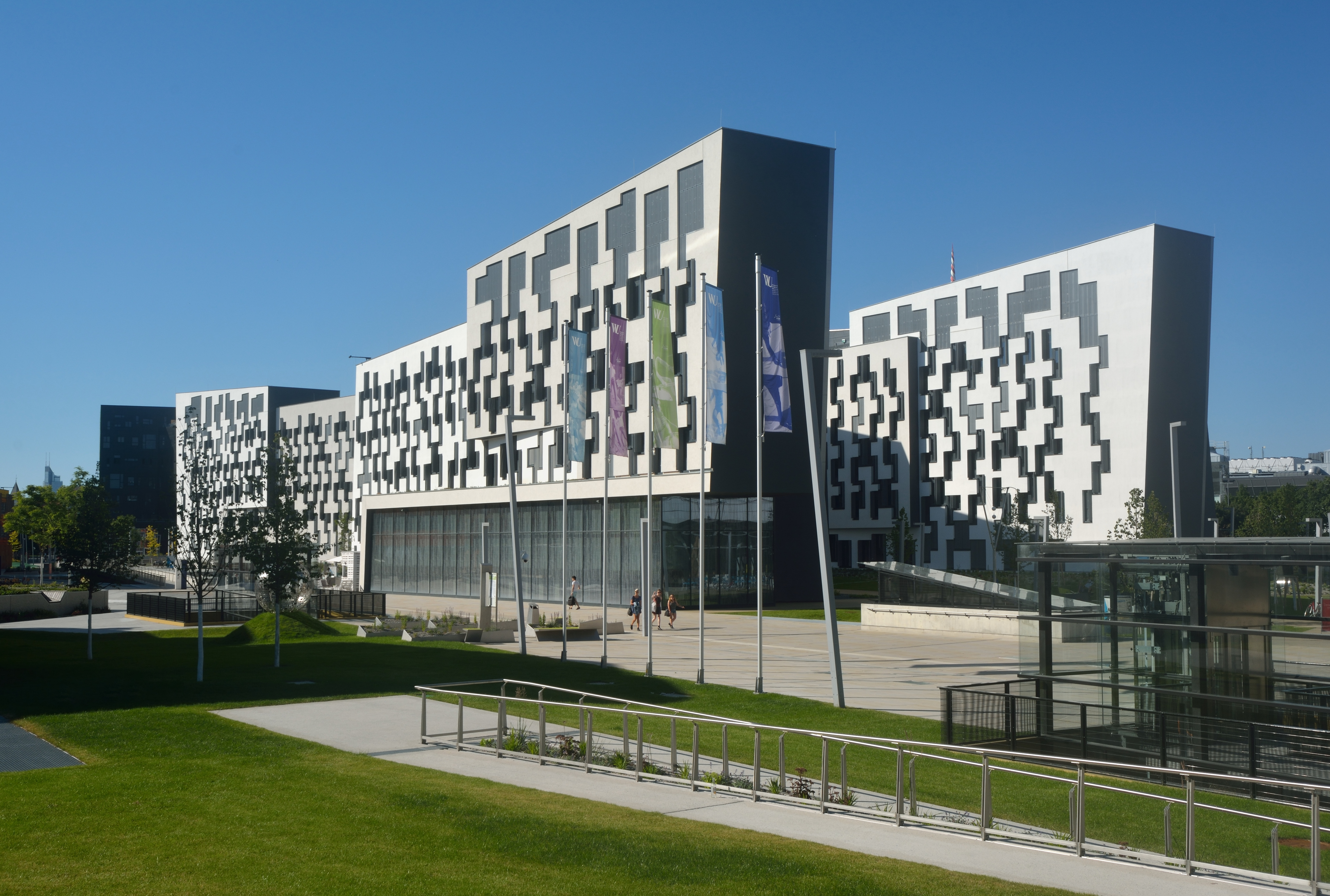
Campus of the Vienna University of Economics and Business, Departement 4

=== With Estudio Carme Pinos ===
- 1999 Urban Park and Bridge (Spanish:Pasarela a Petrer), Petrer, Alicante
- 1999 Juan Aparicio Waterfront Torrevieja, Spain
- 2001 La Serra High School, Mollerussa, Spain
- 2002 Parc de Ses Estacions, Palma de Mallorca, Spain
- 2004 Torre Cube, Guadalajara, Mexico
- 2005 Sports centre, Valle de Egüés, Spain
- 2006 Primary School, Castelldefels, Spain
- 2013 Vienna University of Economics and Business, building Departement 4
- 2014 CaixaForum Zaragoza, Zaragoza, Spain
- 2017 Escola Massana, Art and Design Center, Barcelona, Spain

== Awards ==
- 1987 FAD Prize for Interiorism - La Llauna School in Badalona
- 1991 Italstad for Europe Prize, Europe Biennial of Architecture - Cemetery Park of Igualada
- 1992 City of Barcelona Prize, Barcelona Town Council - Olympic Archery Range buildings, Barcelona
- 1992 FAD Prize for Architecture, Barcelona - Cemetery Park of Igualada
- 1995 Spanish Architecture Award for the boarding school in Morella
- 1999 Dragados Prize - Cemetery Park of Igualada
- 2001 College of Valencian Architects Prize for Exterior Spaces - Juan Aparicio waterfront in Torrevieja
- 2002 Decade Prize 1992–2002. Oscar Tusquets Blanca Foundation - Paseo Icària roofing, Barcelona
- 2004 XIII Prize “Vila de Pedreguer” to Urban and Architectural Merit, Pedreguer Council - Life Work Award
- 2005 ArqCatMón (Catalan Architecture in the World), College of Architects of Catalunya - Cube Tower, Mexico
- 2007 First Prize of the IX Biennal of Spanish Architecture. College of Spanish Architects - Cube Tower, Mexico
- 2016 Richard Neutra Award for Professional Excellence from the Cal Poly Pomona Department of Architecture
- 2016 Berkeley-Rupp Architecture Professorship and Prize from the UC Berkeley College of Environmental Design
- 2017 International Award Woman in Architecture, ARVHA, Paris. Association for Research on the City and Habitat

== Bibliography ==
- DOCUMENTOS DE ARQUITECTURA núm. 60, Colegio de Arquitectos de Almería, 2006.
- CARME PINÓS, AN ARCHITECTURE OF OVERLAY of Ana María Torres, Monacelli Press, 2004, New York.
- CARME PINÓS, SOME PROJECTS (SINCE 1991) Ed. Actar,1998, Barcelona.
- THE ARCHITECTURE OF ENRIC MIRALLES AND CARME PINÓS, Sites Lumen Books, 1990, New York.
- International archive of women in architecture
- Carme Pinós EDLP
- Toy, Maggie; Pran, Peter, eds. (2001). The Architect: Women in Contemporary Architecture (Paperback) (Second ed.). Watson-Guptill Publications. pp. 144–147 (of 184). ISBN 0-8230-1652-8.
- El Croquis 30+49 / 50 Omnibus Volume. Enric Miralles / Carme Pinos: obra construita / built works 1983–1994. Madrid: El Croquis, 1995.
- 2006 RAIA national conference - biography
