= Benedetta Tagliabue =

Italian architect

- Born: Benedetta Tagliabue; 23 June 1963 (age 63); Milan, Italy
- Education: Università Iuav di Venezia
- Occupation: Architect
- Partner(s): Enric Miralles (1992; died 2000)
- Practice: EMBT Architects
- Website: mirallestagliabue.com/benedetta/

Benedetta Tagliabue (born 23 June 1963) is an Italian architect based in Barcelona. Along with Spanish architect Enric Miralles, the pair co-founded EMBT Architects, an international studio, where she is currently the principal and director. Several prominent projects of the firm include the Scottish Parliament Building in Edinburgh and the Gas Natural Building in Barcelona. Tagliabue is also the president of the Enric Miralles Foundation (Fundació Eric Miralles), an architectural research center in Miralles's honor.

== Early life and education ==
Tagliabue was born in Milan, Lombardy, to a family originally from Monza. During her youth, Tagliabue spent her time between Italy and Spain. Tagliabue started her architectural studies at the Università Iuav di Venezia in 1981. In 1988, she began to collaborate professionally with the architectural firms Transbuilding and Agrest-Gandelsonas in New York City. Tagliabue eventually graduated from the Università Iuav di Venezia in 1989.

== Career ==
In 1991, Tagliabue won first prize with her thesis in the "Biennal Joves de Barcelona". In the following year, before the Summer Olympics in Barcelona, she started a relationship with Enric Miralles (1955–2000).

=== EMBT ===
In 1994, Tagliabue and Miralles formed the Barcelona-based architecture firm Miralles Tagliabue EMBT, later renamed Benedetta Tagliabue - EMBT. In 1995, the firm won the National Architecture Award of Spain for a boarding school in Morella. Miralles' most important projects, the Scottish Parliament Building in Edinburgh and the multi-storied Gas Natural building in Barcelona, were finished by Tagliabue after his death in 2000, along with the remodelling of Barcelona's Santa Caterina market.

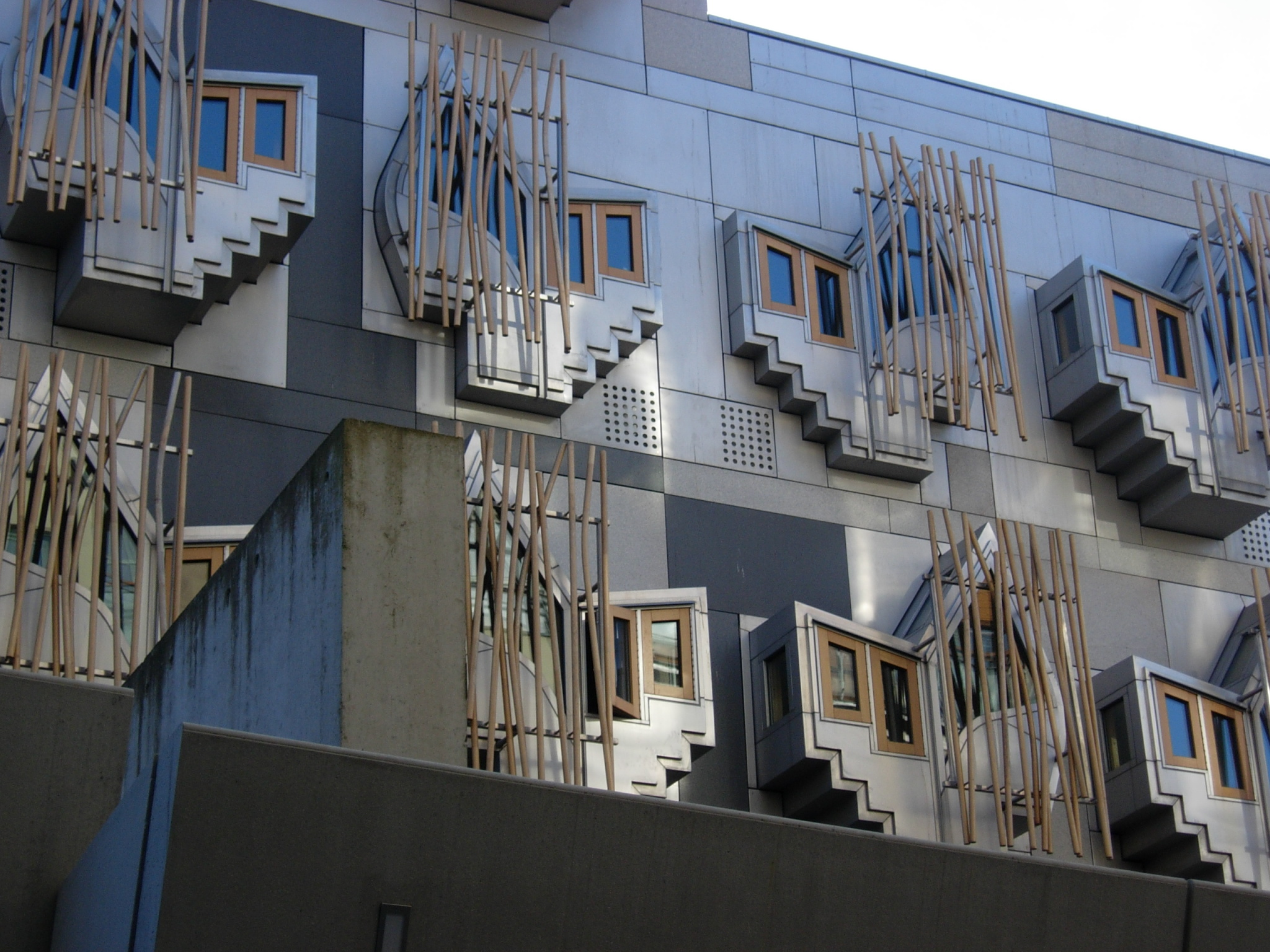
View of the Scottish Parliament Building from John Reid Close

Tagliabue worked on the Spanish Pavilion completed for the 2010 Shanghai Expo.

In 2022, Tagliabue's home featured in Apple TV's Home in season 2, where she detailed the construction and renovation of her and her late husband's Barcelona gothic villa.

=== Academic career ===
In 2004, Tagliabue received an honorary Doctor of Arts degree from Napier University and she is a member of the Royal Incorporation of Architects in Scotland. Tagliabue teaches at the University of Architecture ETSAB (Escola Tècnica Superior d'Arquitectura de Barcelona) in Barcelona and lectures regularly in architectural forums.

=== Awards judge ===
Benedetta has been a juror in the Pritzker Architecture Prize, Princesa de Asturias de las Artes, Loewe Craft Prize, RIBA Jencks Awards, and the 2024 RIBA Stirling Prize.

== Selected work ==
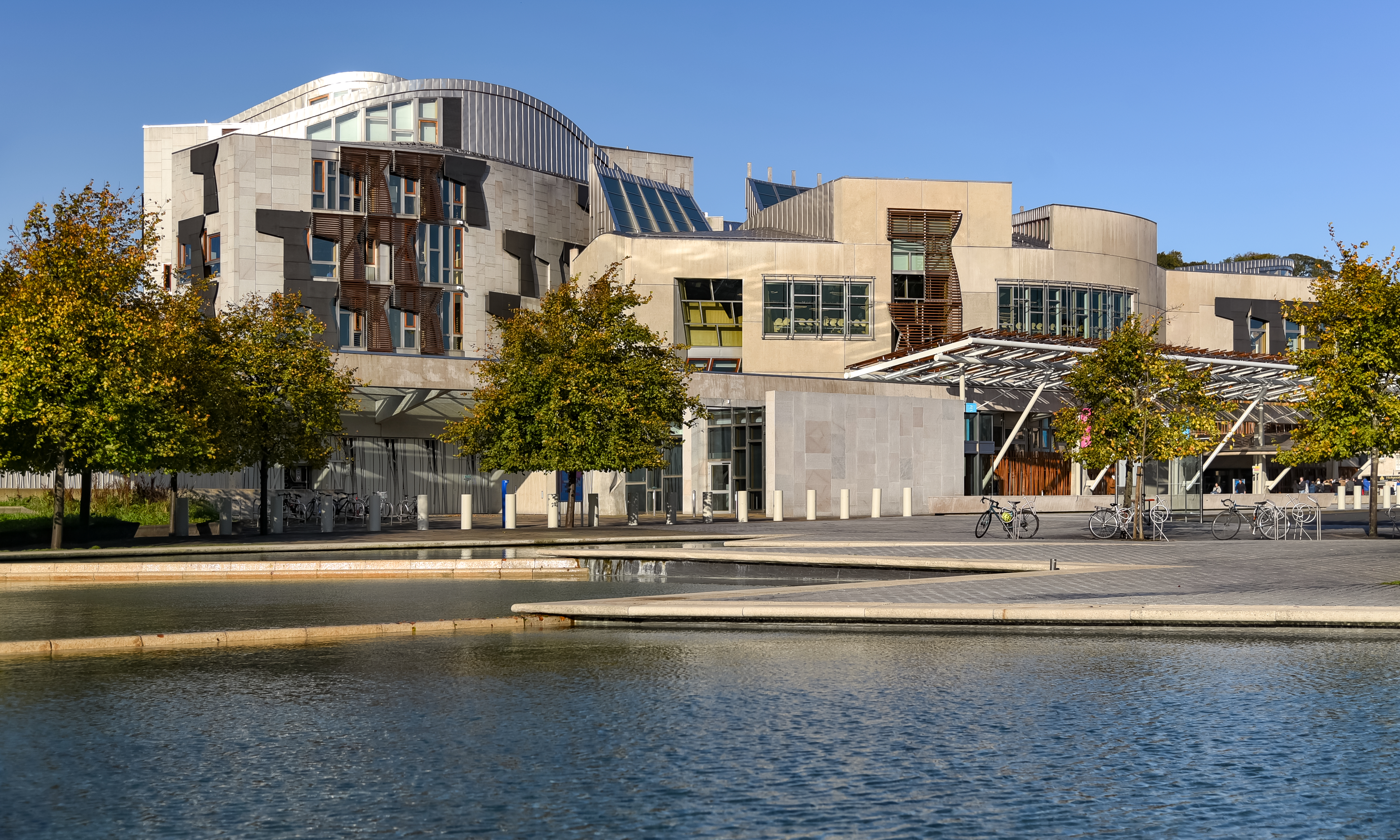
Scottish Parliament Building

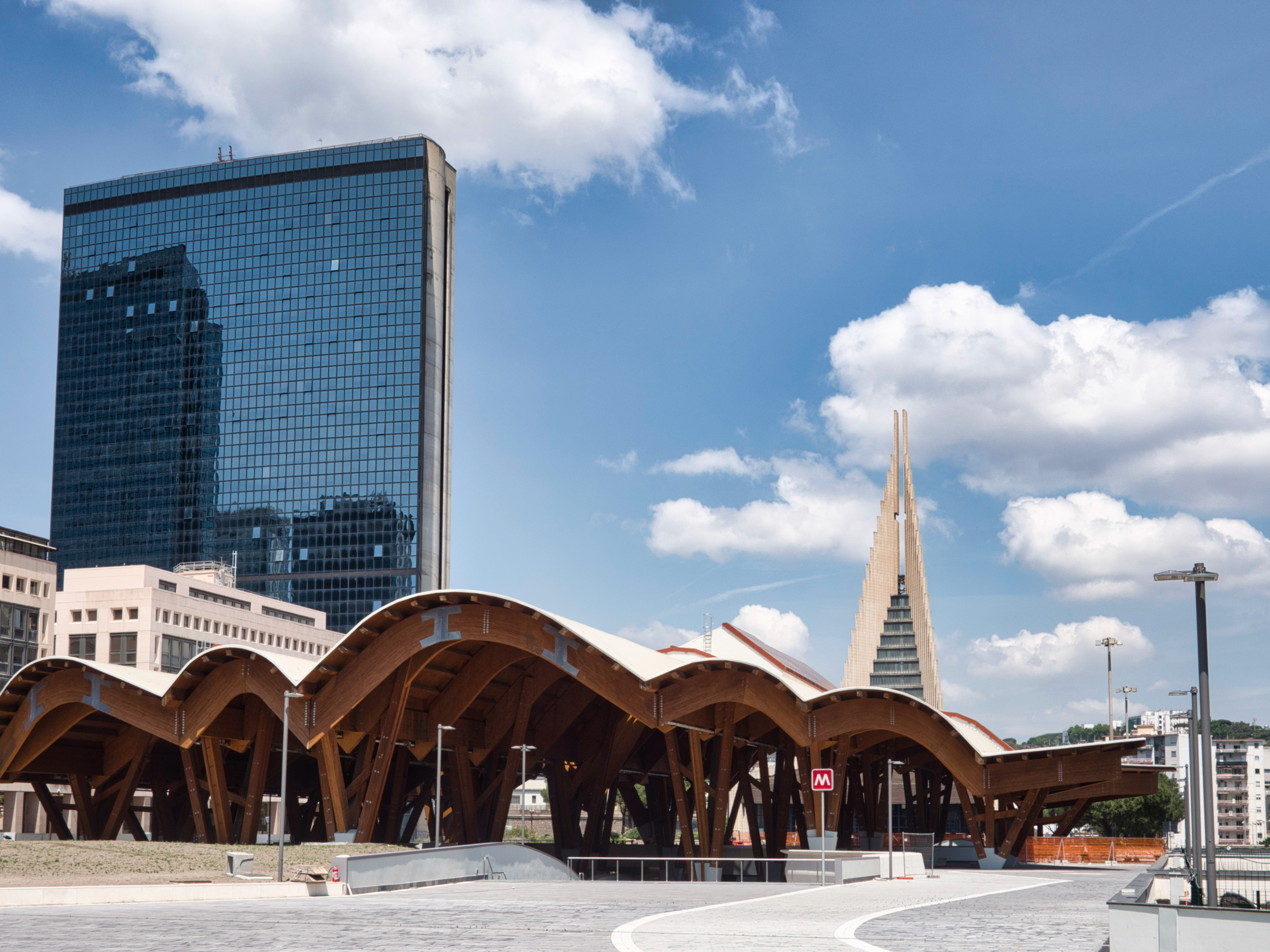
Naples Metro Centro Direzionale station

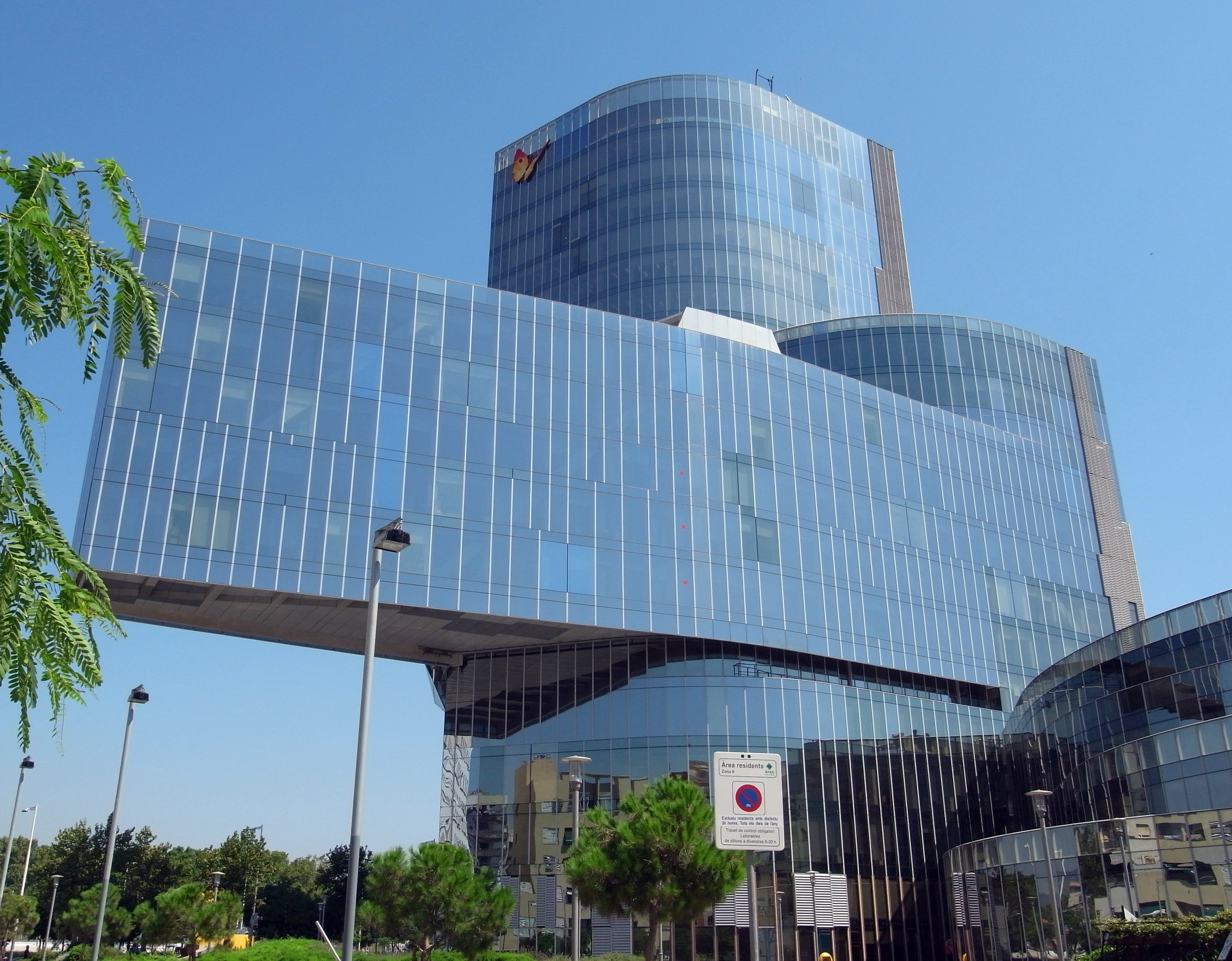
Torre Mare Nostrum, new headquarters of Gas Natural, Barcelona

- The Scottish Parliament Building, Edinburgh, United Kingdom (1999; completed 2004)
- House at La Clota, Barcelona, Catalonia, Spain (1999)
- Six houses, Amsterdam, Netherlands (2000)
- Utrecht City Hall extension, Netherlands (1996–2000)
- Extension of the Music School, Hamburg, Germany (1997–2000)
- Set design for the opera "Don Quijote", Liceu Theatre, Barcelona, Spain (2000)
- Hafen City public spaces in Hamburg, Germany (2002)
- Parc de Diagonal Mar, Barcelona, Spain (1997–2002)
- Vigo University Campus, Vigo, Spain (2003)
- Santa Caterina Market, Barcelona, Spain (1996–2005)
- Principal Building University Campus at Vigo (2006)
- Gas Natural Building (1999–2006)
- Palafolls Public Library, Palafolls, Spain (2007)
- Acoustic panels for Gran Via traffic way renovation in Barcelona (2007)
- Social housing in Figueres, Catalonia, Spain (2007)
- Scenery for Merce Cunningham Dance Company (2009)
- Spanish Pavilion at the Shanghai Expo 2010 (RIBA Best International Building 2011 Award.)
- Plaza Ricard Viñes, Lleida, Spain (2010)
- Fudan University Business School in Shanghai, China.
- Clichy-Montfermeil metro station in Paris, France (2014)
- Office towers in Taichung, Taiwan (2019)
- The Church and Parish Complex San Giacomo Apóstolo in Ferrara (2022), awarded the Dedalo Minosse International Prize.
- Centro Direzionale station in Naples, Italy (2025)

== Awards ==
- 2001 Rietveld Prize for the Utrecht town Council, The Netherlands
- 2001 Premi Nacional de Catalunya for Santa Caterina Market in Barcelona
- 2002 BDA Hamburg Architektur Preis for the Music School of Hamburg
- 2002 National Architectural Prize of Catalonia
- 2004 Honorary doctorate from Edinburgh Napier University, Scotland
- 2004 Premio FAD de Arquitectura in for the University Campus in Vigo
- 2005 RIBA Stirling Prize for the Scottish Parliament Building
- 2005 Honour Award of the American Society of Landscape Architects for the Diagonal Mar Park in Barcelona
- 2005 Premio de la Bienal de Arquitectura Española for the Scottish Parliament in Edinburgh.
- 2006 Prize Leone d'Oro at the Biennale di Venezia for the Pavilion dedicated to the Sports Hall of Huesca, Aragon, (Spain) for the Biennal of Venice 1996, VI International Exhibition of Architecture. "Sensori del Futuro: l'Architetto come Sismografo". Director Hans Hollein.
- 2006 Spanish National Architectural Prize
- 2009 Prize Ciutat de Barcelona
- 2010 Category International projection The Spanish Pavilion Exhibition Shanghai
- 2011 RIBA Best International Building Award
- 2011-2022 Princesa de Asturias de las Artes Jury Member
- 2013 RIBA Charles Jencks Award
- 2019 Sant Jordi Cross from the Generalitat de Catalunya
- 2020 The Leadership Award at Piranesi Prix de Rome
- 2021 The Leadership Award at the Smart City Expo World Congress
- 2022 Member of Pontificia Accademia dei Virtuosi al Pantheon Rome
- 2022 Dedalo Minosse International Prize
- 2022 Prix Le Soufaché l’Académie d’Architecture Paris
- 2023 Global Award for Sustainable Architecture

== Publications ==
- 2009 EL CROQUIS, N. 144. EMBT 2000 2009 ENRIC MIRALLES BENEDETTA TAGLIABUE After-life in progress.
- 2008 AA. Arquitecturas de Author 2006. EMBT Miralles-Tagliabue. (Edición T6 Ediciones 2006, Escuela Técnica Superior de Arquitectura. Universidad de Navarra, Pamplona, Navarre, Spain).
- 2007 Benedetta Tagliabue "Eating the City" Workshop Printemps 2007. ESA Productions (École Spéciale d’Architecture Paris).
- 2006 ACTAR, Catalan College of Architects, Ministry of Housing, Barcelona City Hall, Works in Progress, revised and extended edition
- 2004 Architecture drawn. The project of Miralles Tagliabue for Diagonal Mar. (Salvat + EMBT MirallesTagliabue, Barcelona, España 2004)
- 2003 Loft / teNeues, Miralles Tagliabue EMBT Arquitectes
- 2000 El Croquis N.100 101, Enric Miralles Benedetta Tagliabue 1996–2000
- 1999 GG. Miralles Tagliabue time architecture. Architecture Monograph, Editorial Gustavo Gili
- 1995 Mixed Talks, a book about the latest projects of the Miralles Office was published by Academy Editions.
- 1996 Monographic issue of their work KA Korean Architects. Edited Enric Miralles: opere e Progetti, published by Electa
- EMBT Enric Miralles, Bernadetta Tagliabue, Work in Progress (Paperback) (in English and Catalan). Col-legi d'Arquitectes de Catalunya Publications. 2004.
