= Royal Collections Gallery =

- Galería de las Colecciones Reales

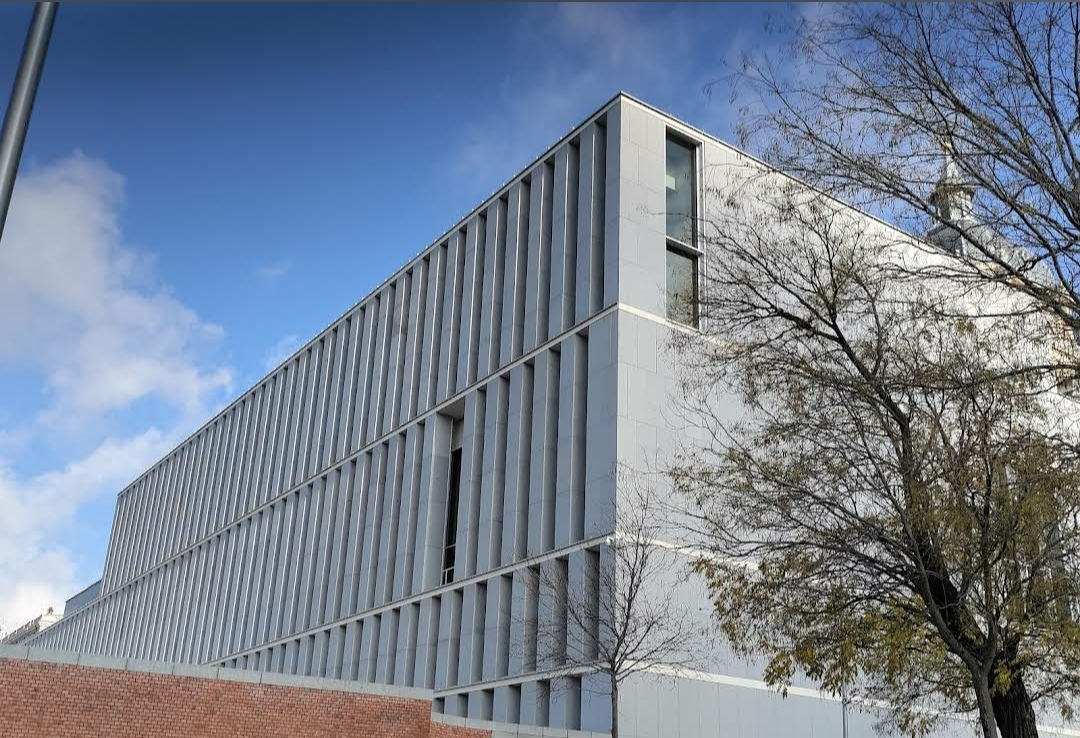
- Established: 28 June 2023
- Location: Cuesta de la Vega, Madrid
- Coordinates: 40.4156°N 3.7156°W
- Type: Art museum
- Collection size: 155,000 artworks
- Visitors: 741,589 (2025)
- Director: Víctor Cageao
- Architects: Emilio Tuñón and Luis Moreno Mansilla
- Owner: Patrimonio Nacional
- Public transit access: Ópera
- Website: www.galeriadelascoleccionesreales.es

The Royal Collections Gallery (Spanish: Galería de las Colecciones Reales), originally named the Royal Collections Museum, is an art museum in Madrid. Run by Patrimonio Nacional, it is located in a new building above the gardens of the Campo del Moro park and next to the Almudena Cathedral and the Royal Palace.

It is intended for the public exhibition and safekeeping of paintings, sculptures, tapestries, luxury objects, carriages and other artworks and historical pieces from the Spanish royal collection, which is also the main source of artworks for the Museo del Prado and several other museums in Spain.

== History ==
The origin of the museum dates back to the 1930s, when a first project began in 1935 and the Foundation Decree of the Museum of Arms and Carriages was issued in 1936 by the government of the Second Republic, when the president was Manuel Azaña. The start of the Spanish Civil War paralyzed the project, which was resumed in 1950 and again in 1980, but it did not come to fruition at either of those times.

Patrimonio Nacional again raised the idea of building the museum in 1998, reviving the idea of creating a new carriage museum but also exhibiting the works of art, jewelry and tapestries of the dynasties that reigned in Spain in recent centuries, the Habsburgs and the Bourbons.

In 2002, the project presented by the architects Emilio Tuñón and Luis Moreno Mansilla (Mansilla + Tuñón) won the ideas contest for the building, and finally construction started in 2006. The works suffered delays due to the discovery of archaeological remains of the 9th-century Muslim settlement in its location. In addition, the central government had to increase the project's original budget considerably.

The main façade is finished in granite of the Gris Quintana type. This uses stones of great dimensions that had to be emptied on the interior sides to cover the structure of reinforced concrete. The placement of these large pieces was a very complex task, for which a custom-made tool had to be created, which translated into a laying of the first stone as a decisive act. Solid steps, rain gutters, large caps and bespoke tops were made from the same granite.

The construction of the building was completed in 2016, but because of the caretaker status of the government after the 2016 general election, it could not sign the contract of an extra 25 million to finish the interior of the building, and the opening was announced for 2020.

In October 2018, after a year of delays, a temporal cooperation of Empty, specialized in museography, and telecommunications company Telefónica won the public contest for the interior design and presentation of the museum and its collections.

In June 2022, the Minister of the Presidency, Félix Bolaños, and the chairwoman of Patrimonio Nacional, Ana de la Cueva, announced that the museum would open in summer 2023 and be renamed the Royal Collections Gallery. It opened on 28 June 2023 and, in its first year, received more than 600,000 visitors.

== Selected works ==
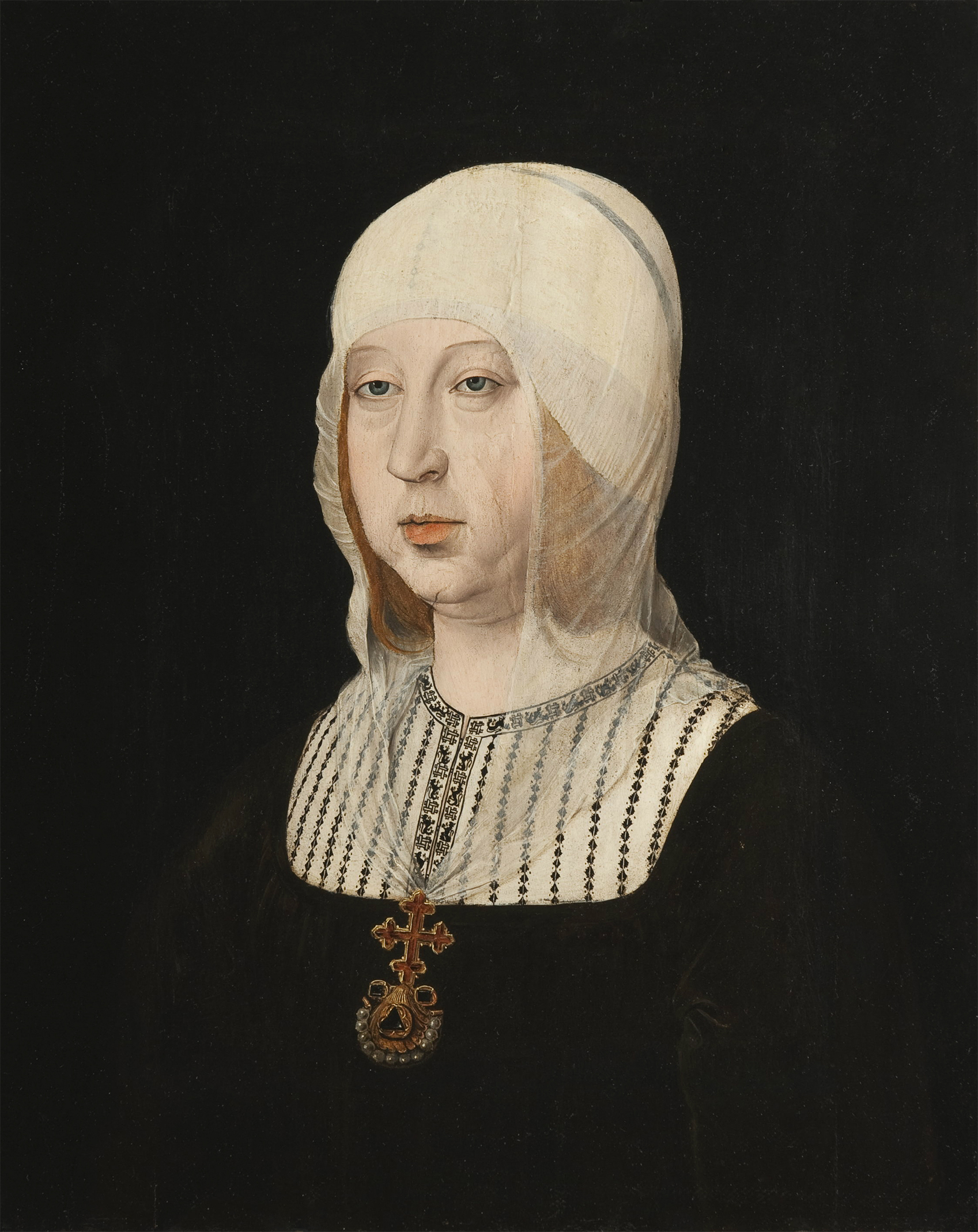
Portrait of Isabella I of Castile, c. 1500–1504, Juan de Flandes

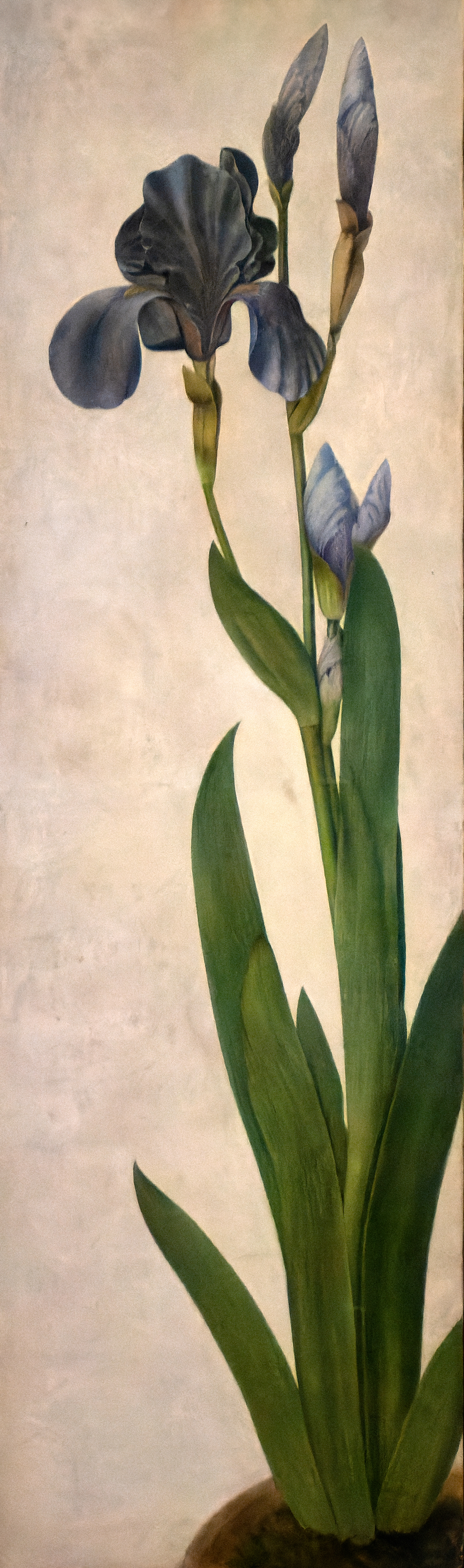
Iris, c. 1503, Albrecht Dürer

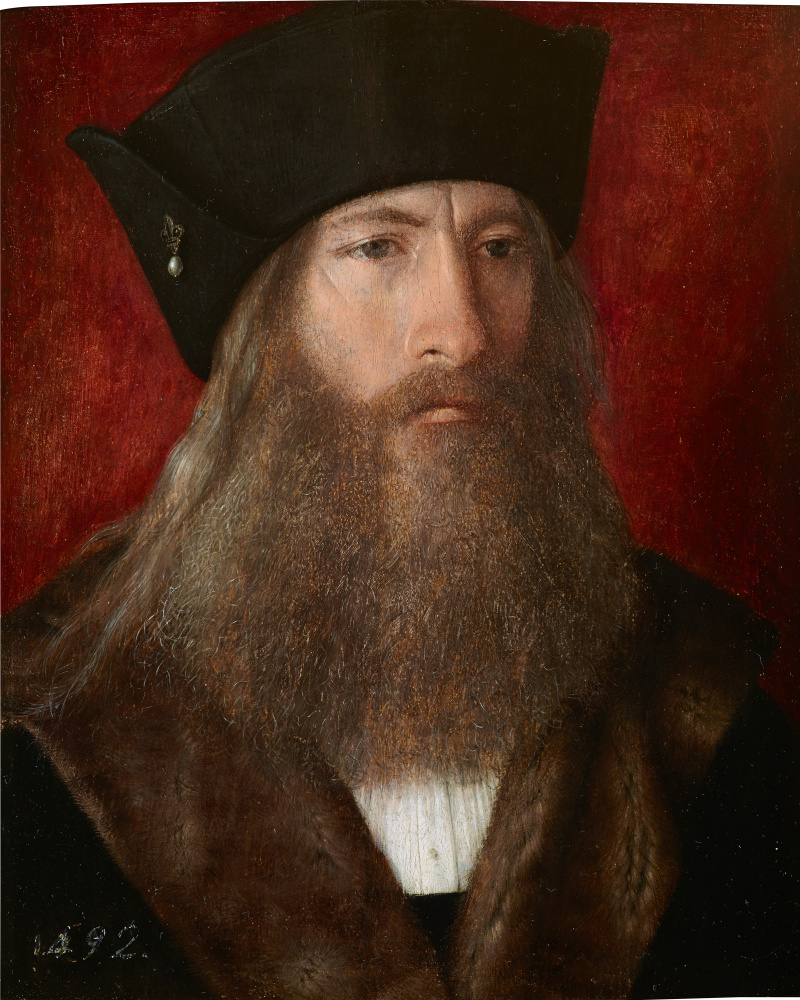
Portrait of a Man with a Pearl, c. 1515–1517, Michel Sittow

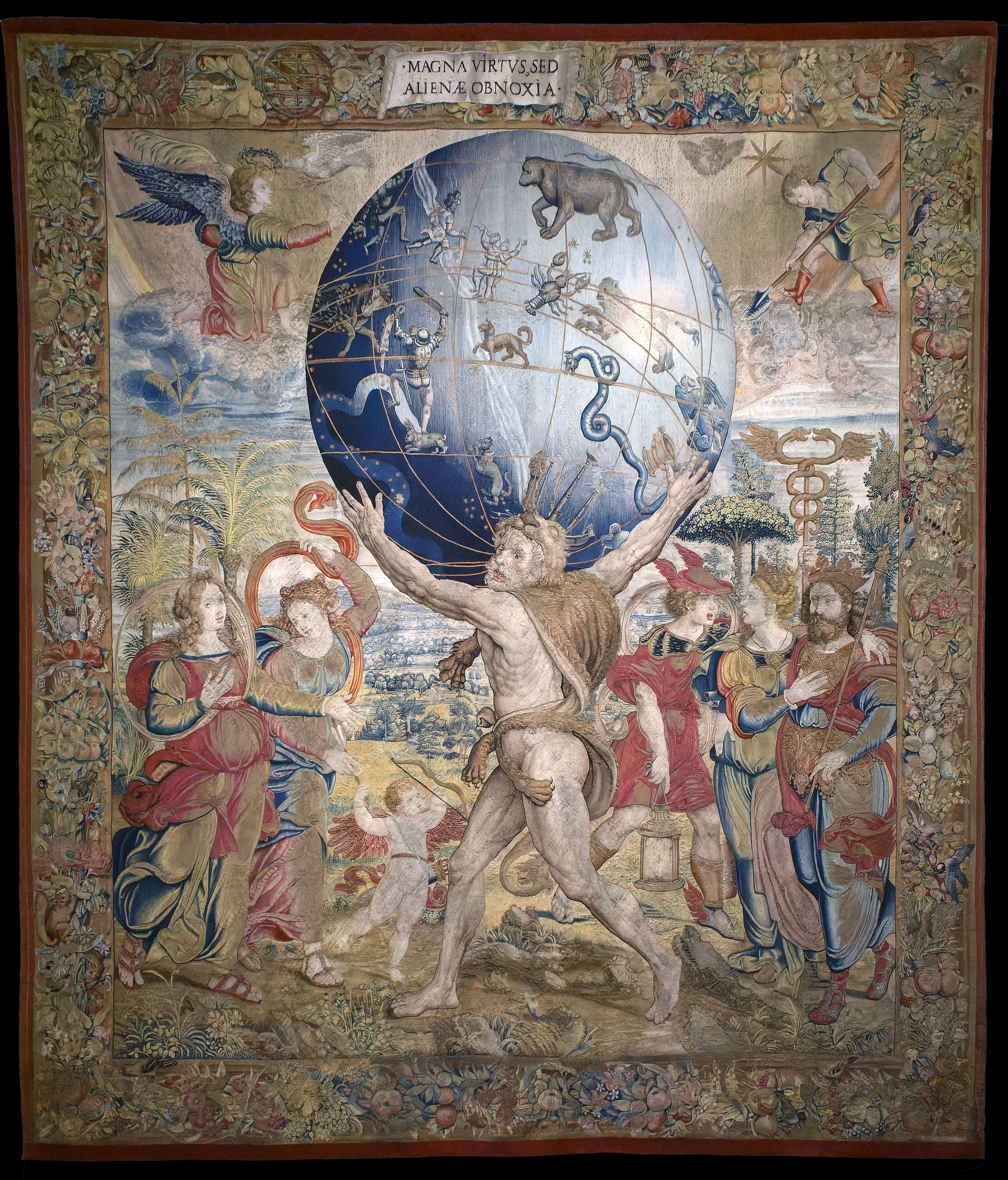
Hercules (tapestry), c. 1530, Bernard van Orley

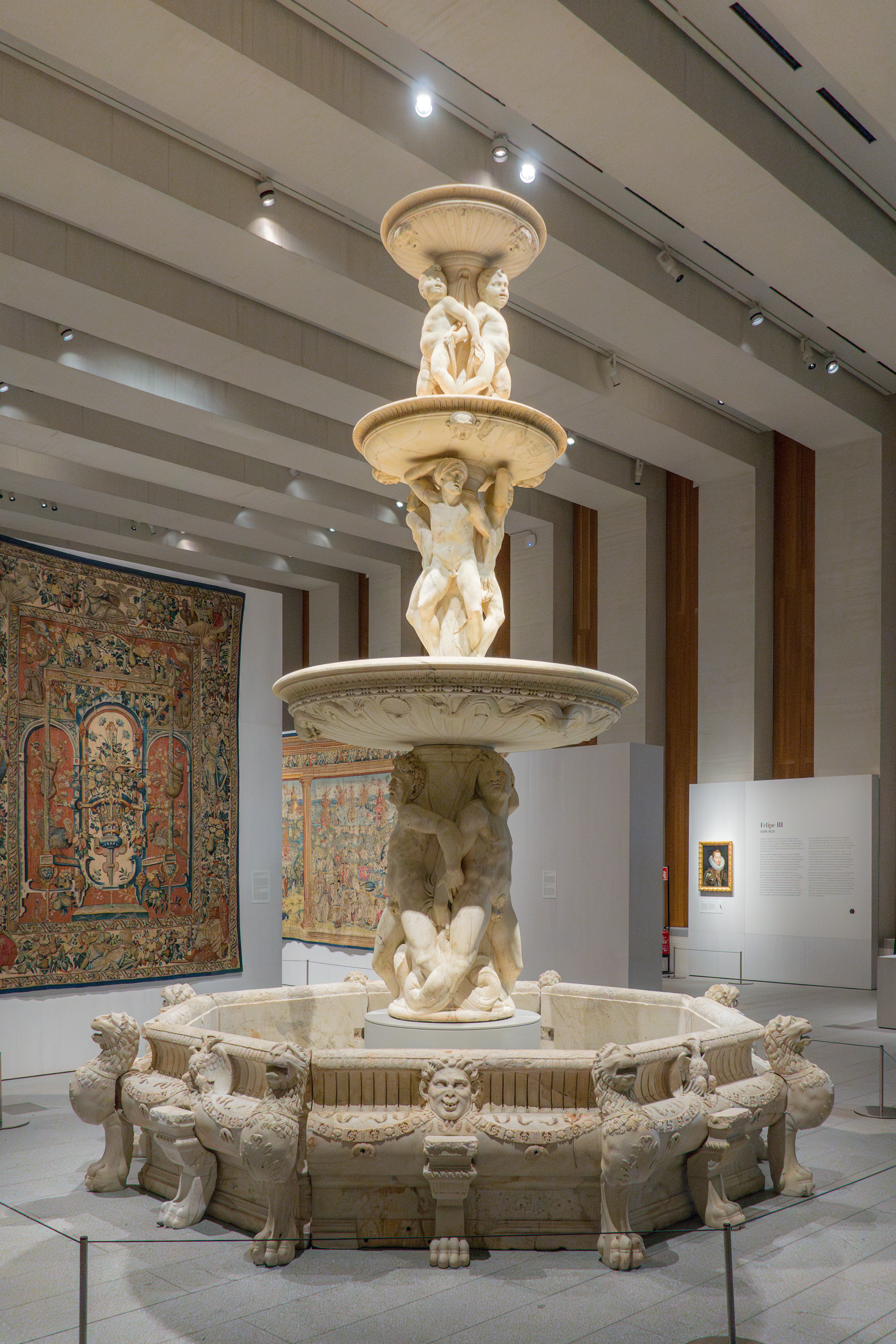
Eagle Fountain c. 1539, Giovanni Montorsoli

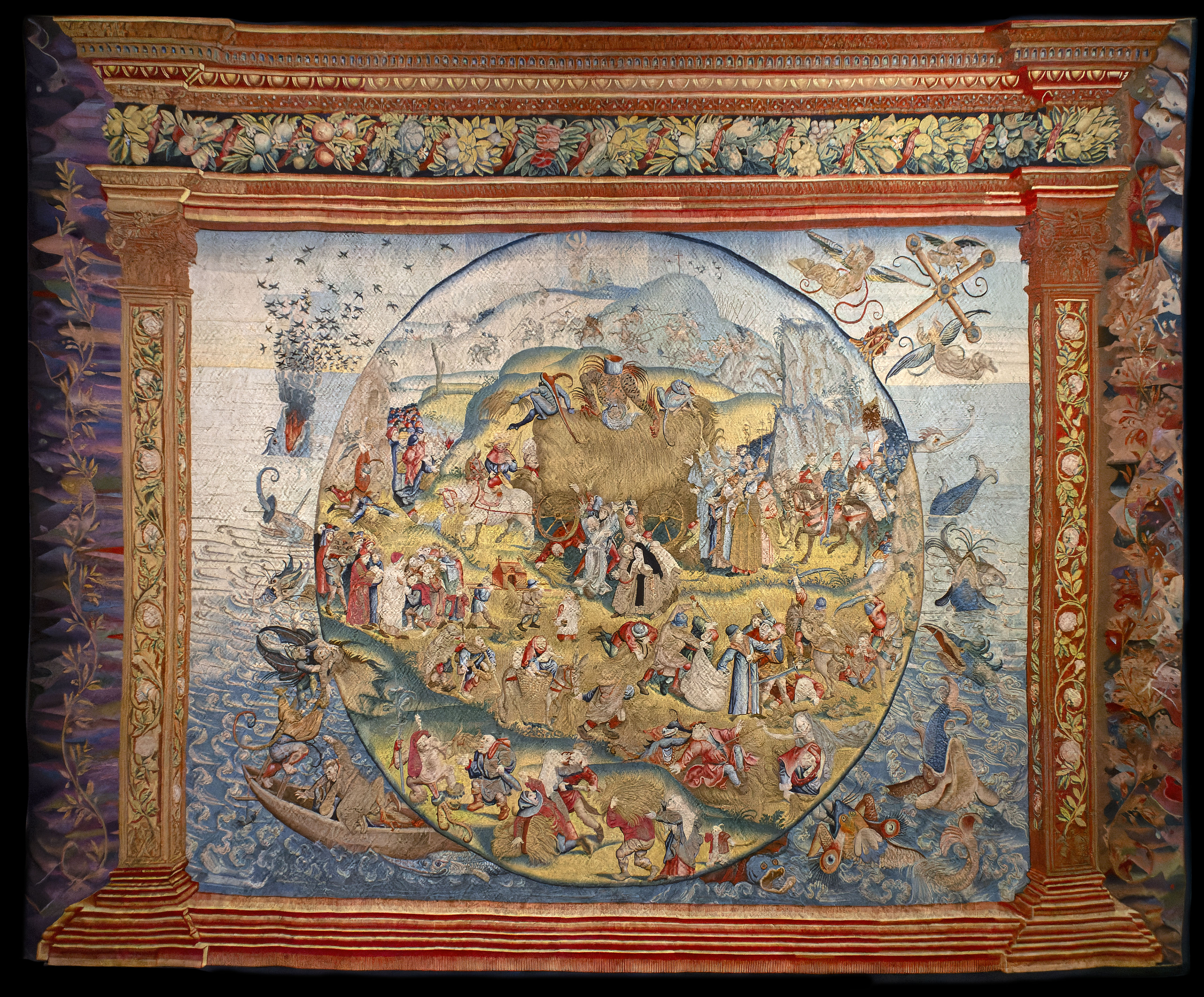
The Haywain (tapestry), 1555, Hieronymus Bosch

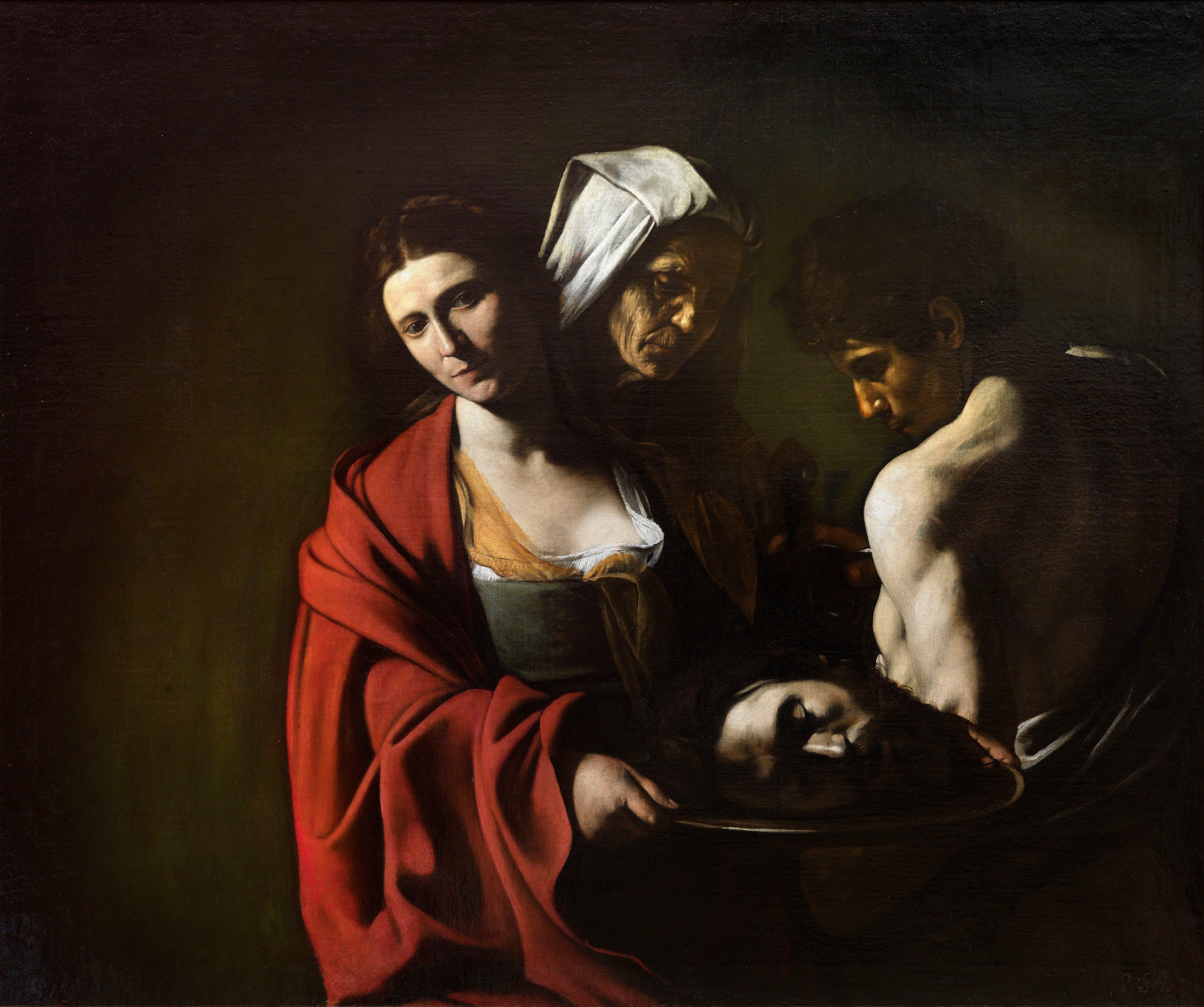
Salome with the Head of John the Baptist, 1609, Caravaggio

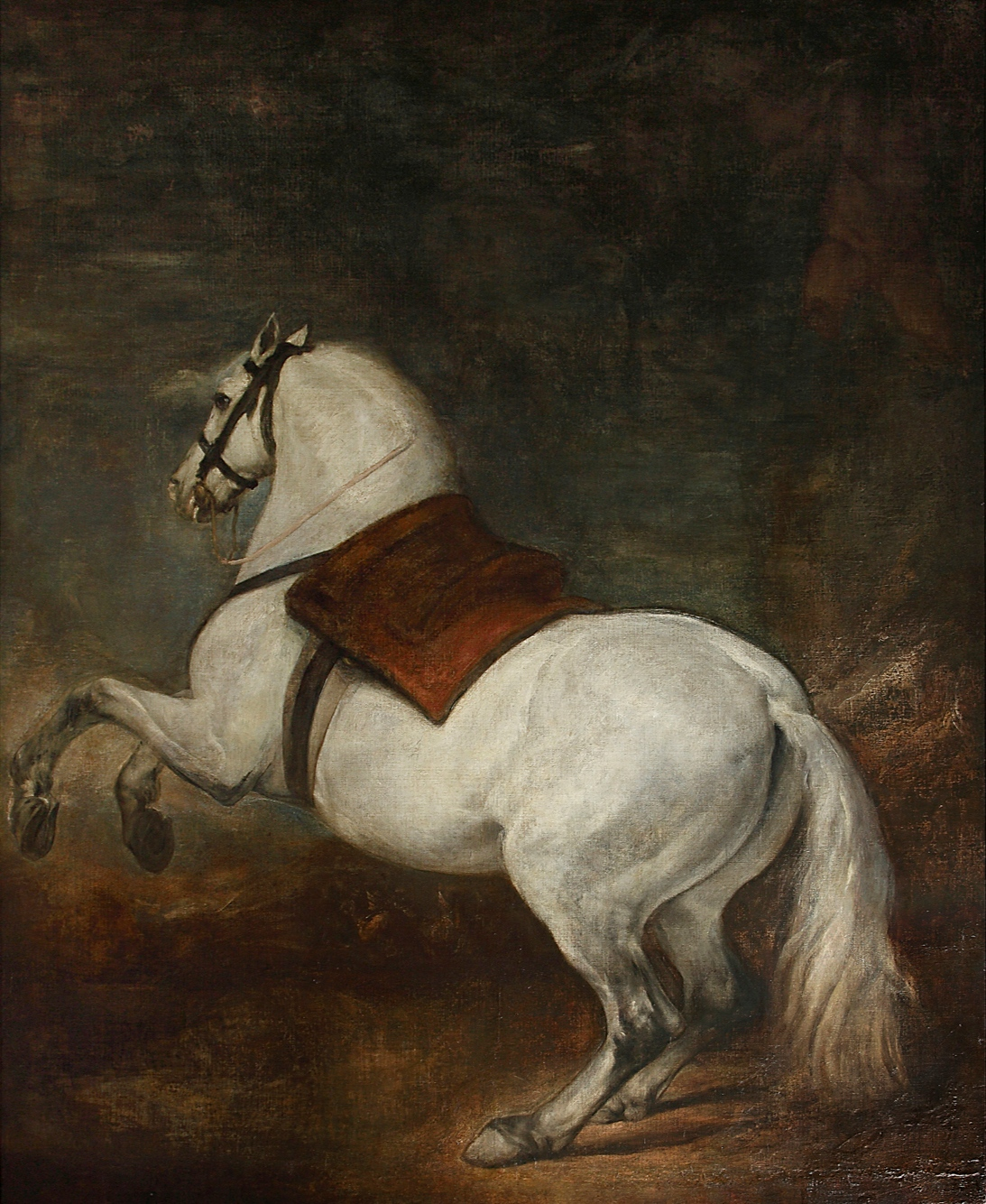
White Horse, c. 1634–1638, Diego Velázquez

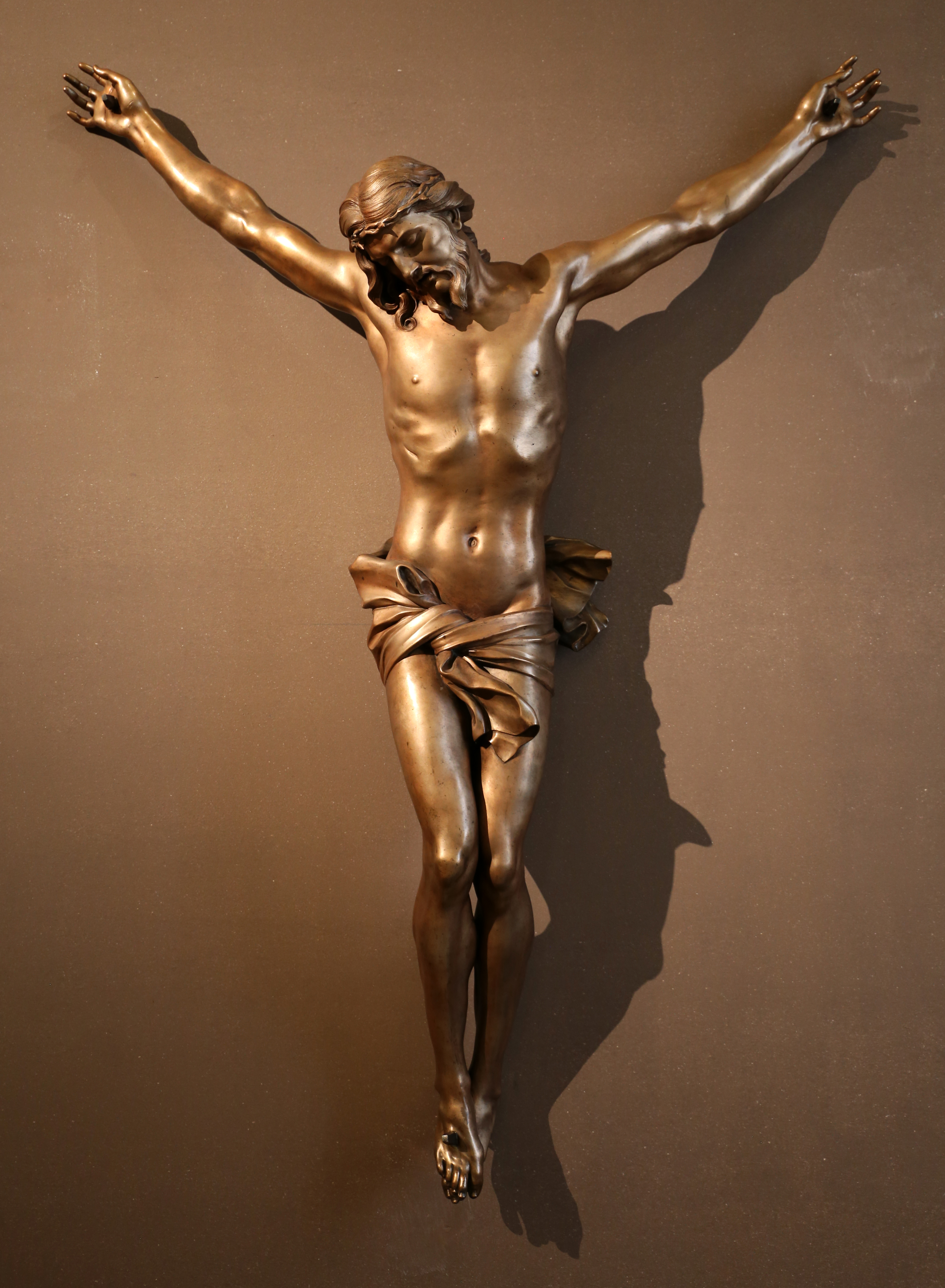
Crucified Christ, 1655, Gian Lorenzo Bernini

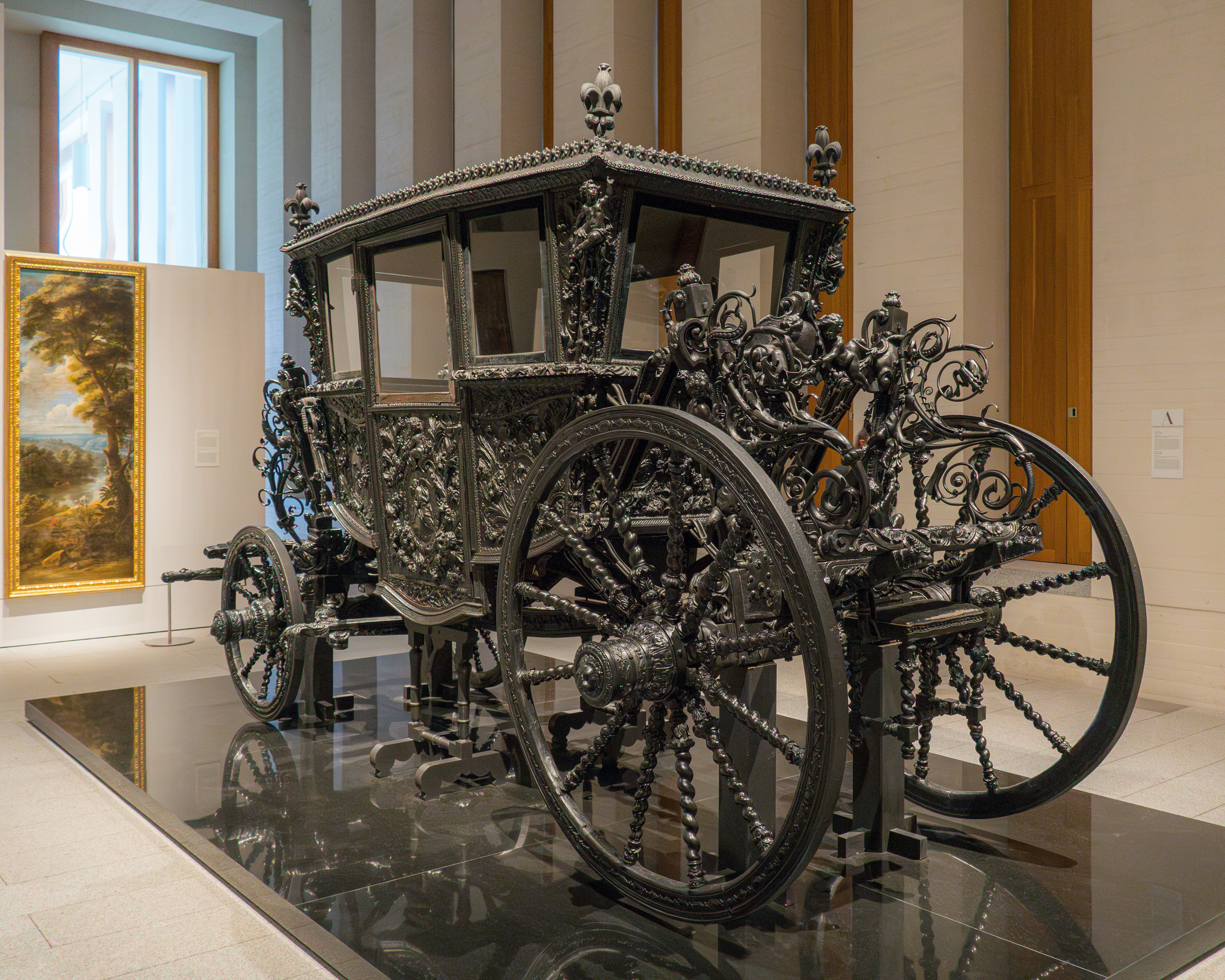
Black Carriage, c. 1670–1680

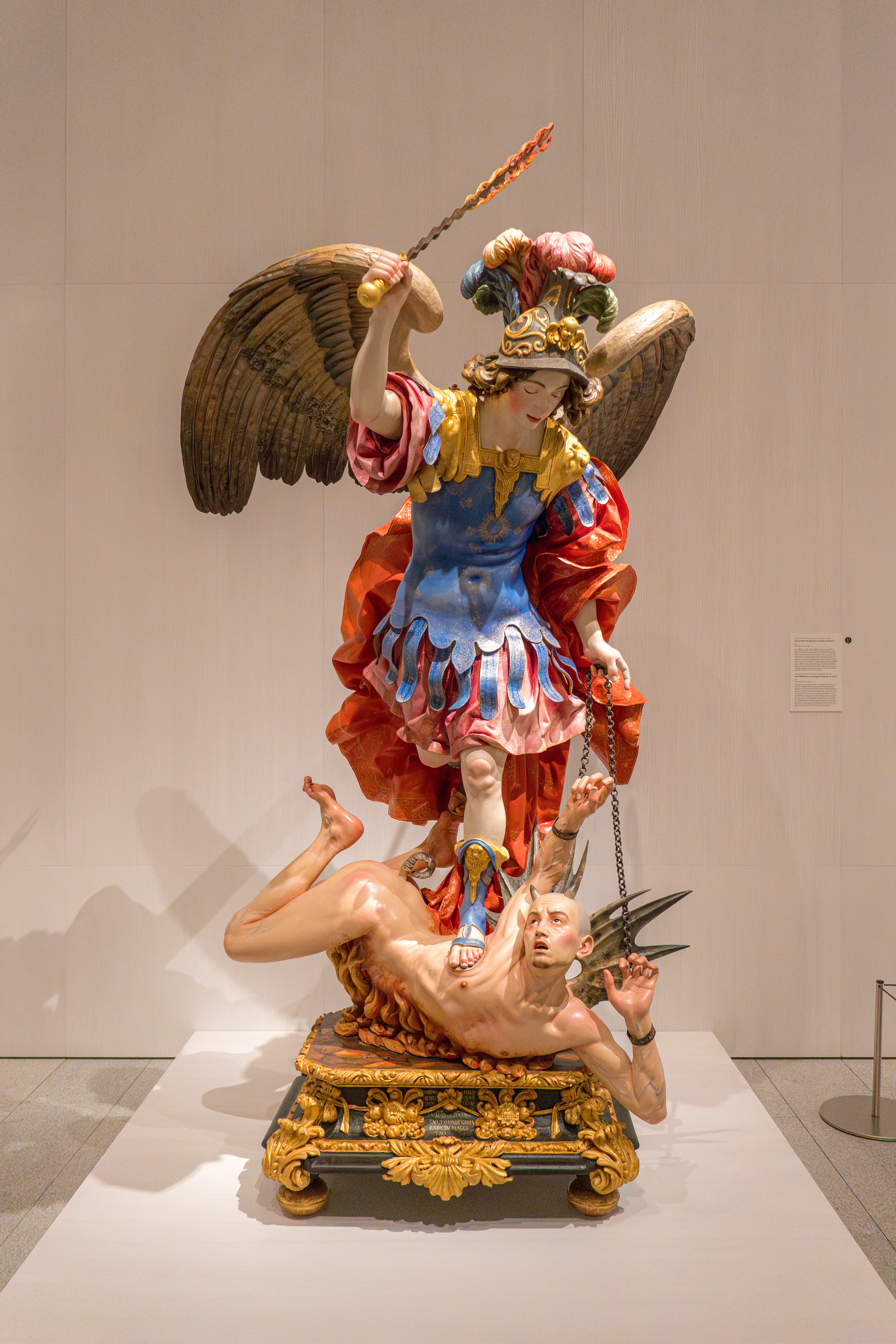
Saint Michael Defeating the Devil, 1692, Luisa Roldán

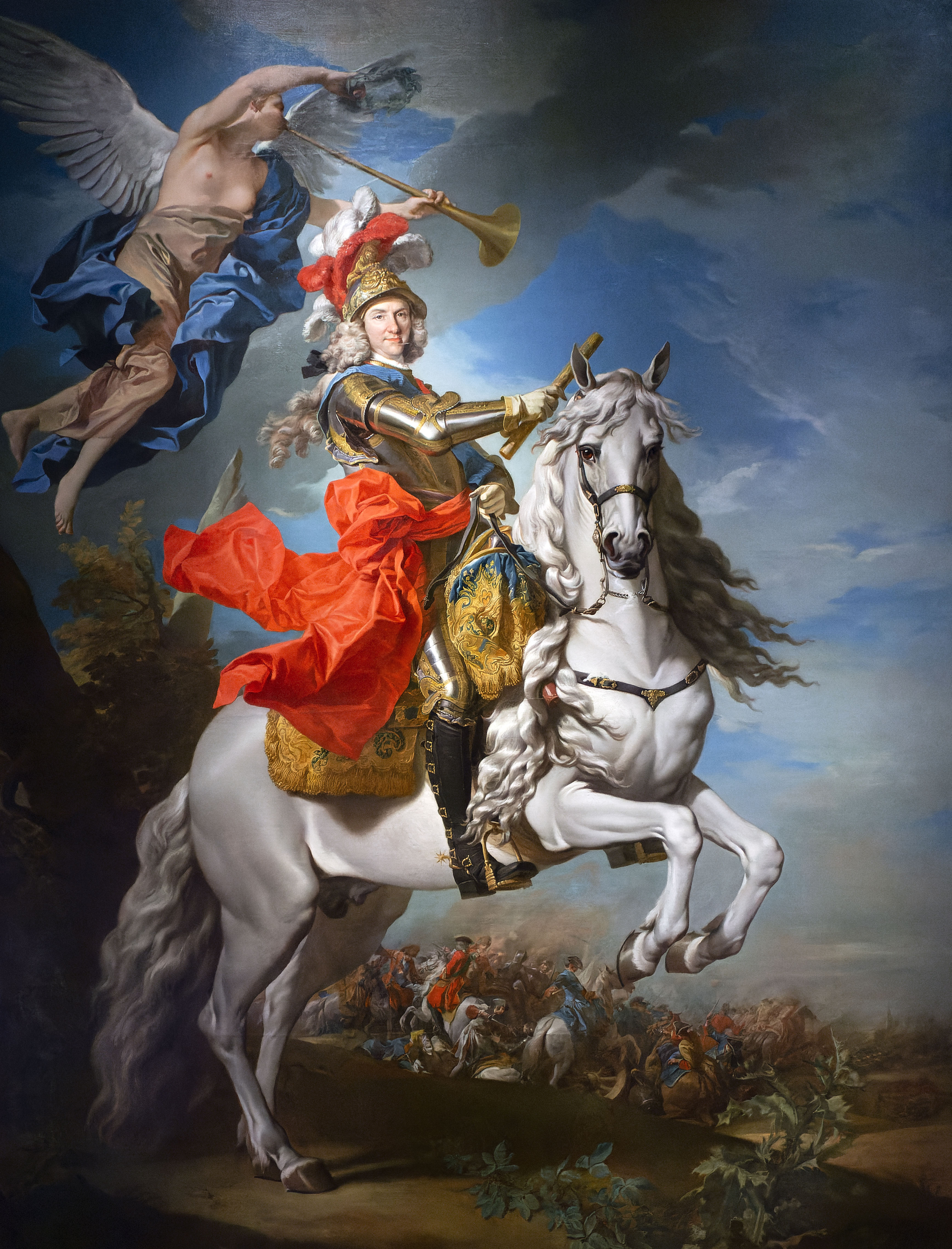
Portrait of Philip V of Spain, 1737, Louis-Michel Van Loo

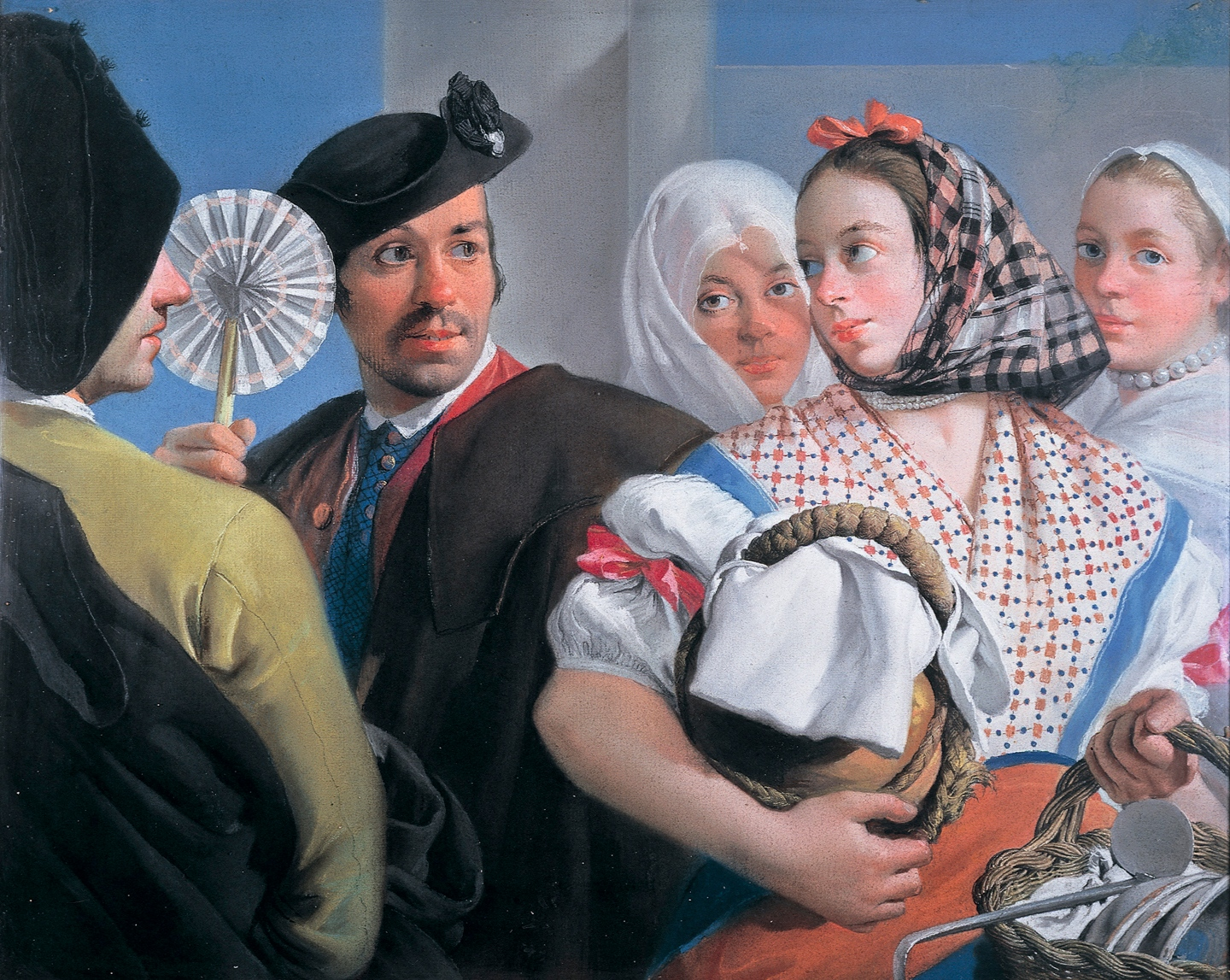
The Honey Seller, 1775, Lorenzo Baldissera Tiepolo

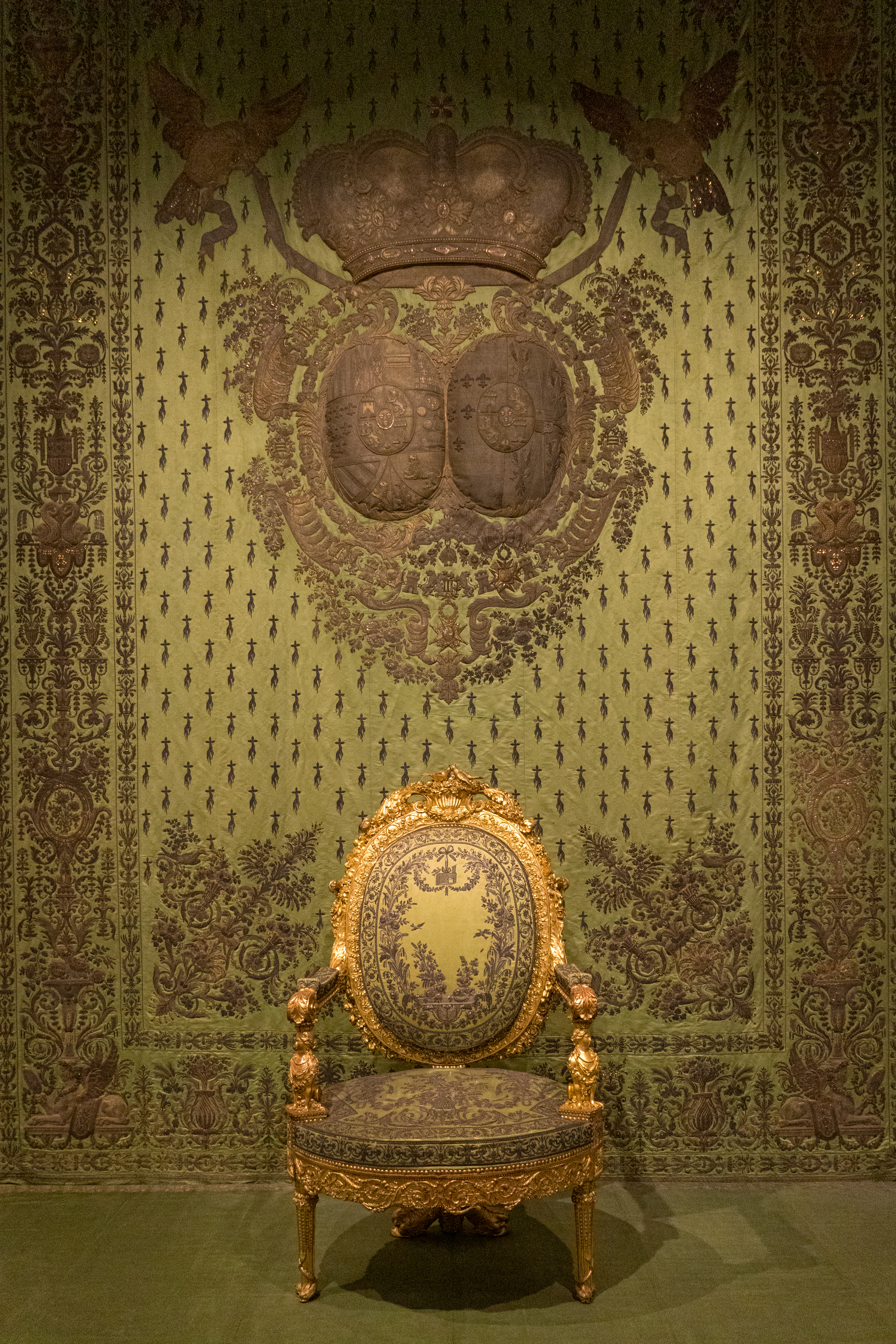
Chair and canopy from Maria Luisa of Parma's audience chamber, c.1793

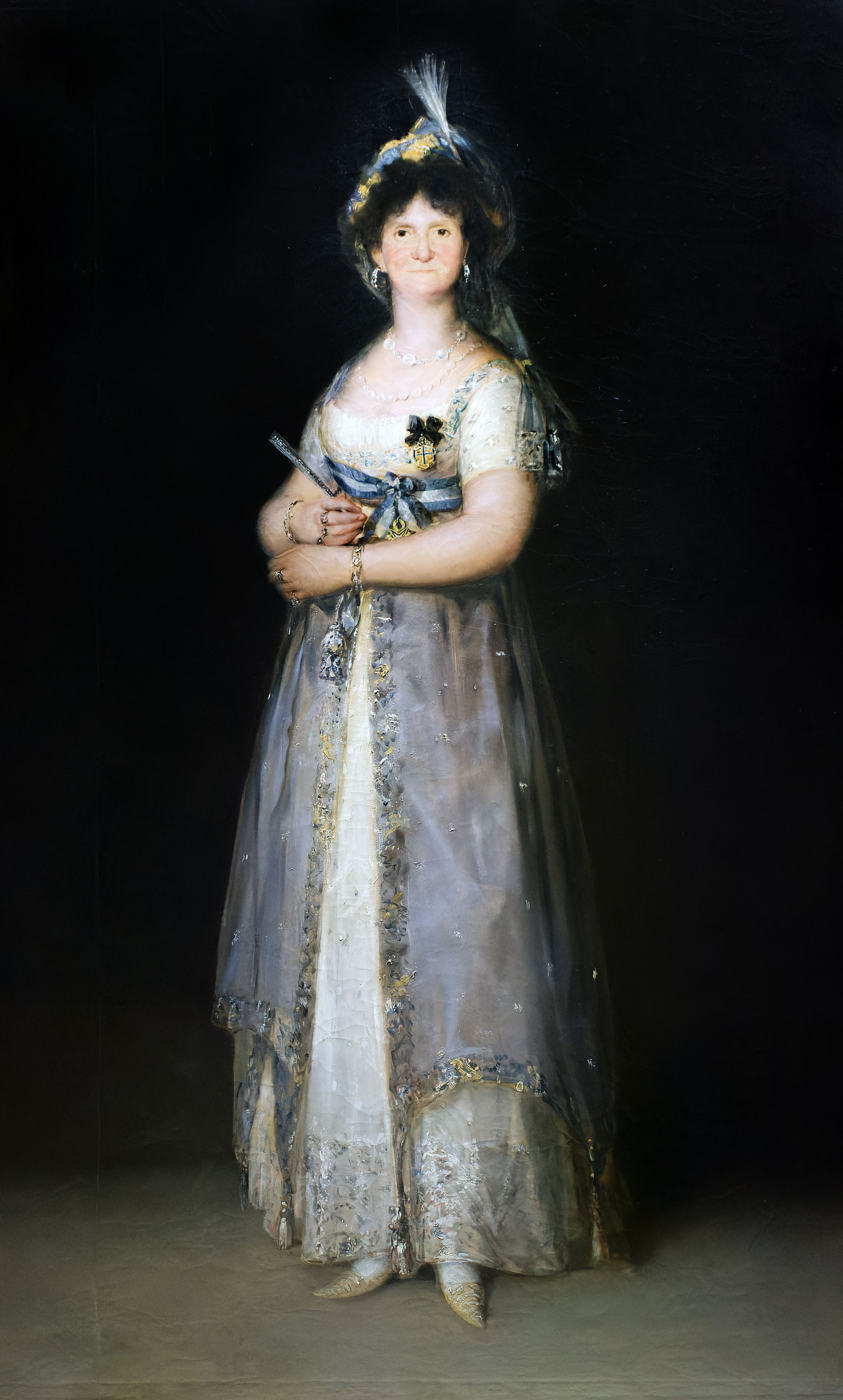
Portrait of Maria Luisa of Parma, 1799, Goya

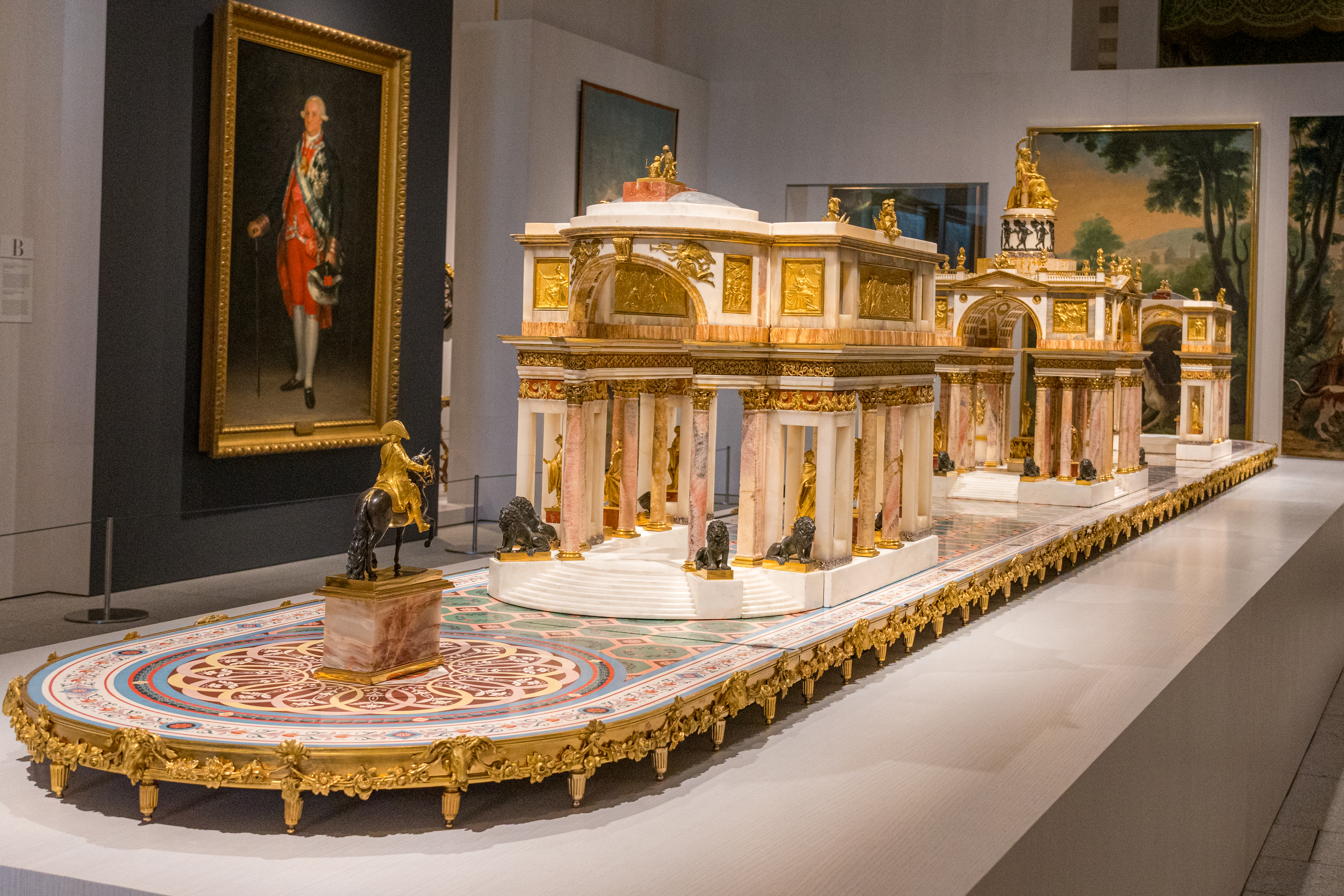
Surtout de table of the Glories of Spain, c. 1802–1805, Isidoro G. Velázquez

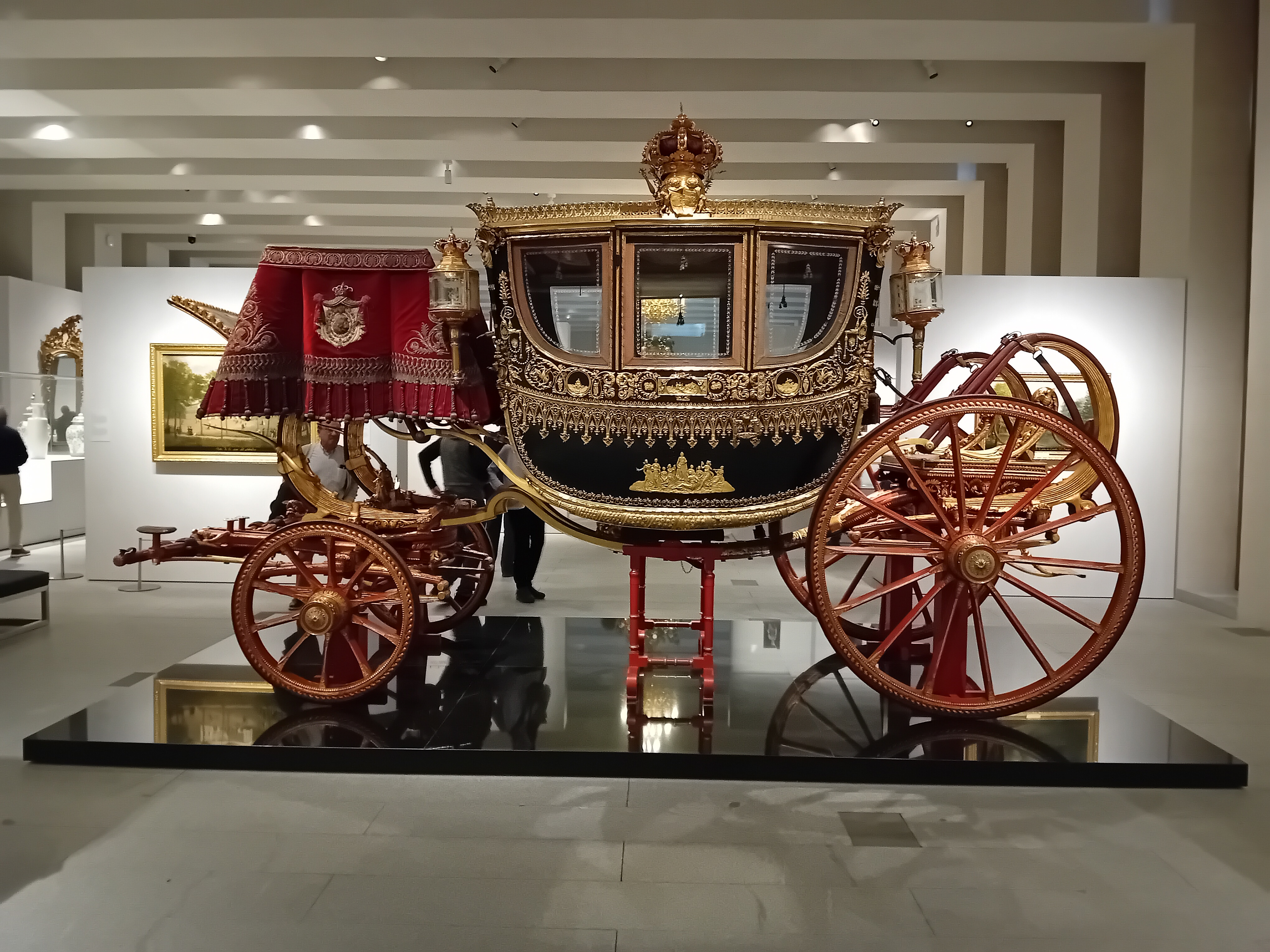
The Royal Crown Coach, c. 1829–1833

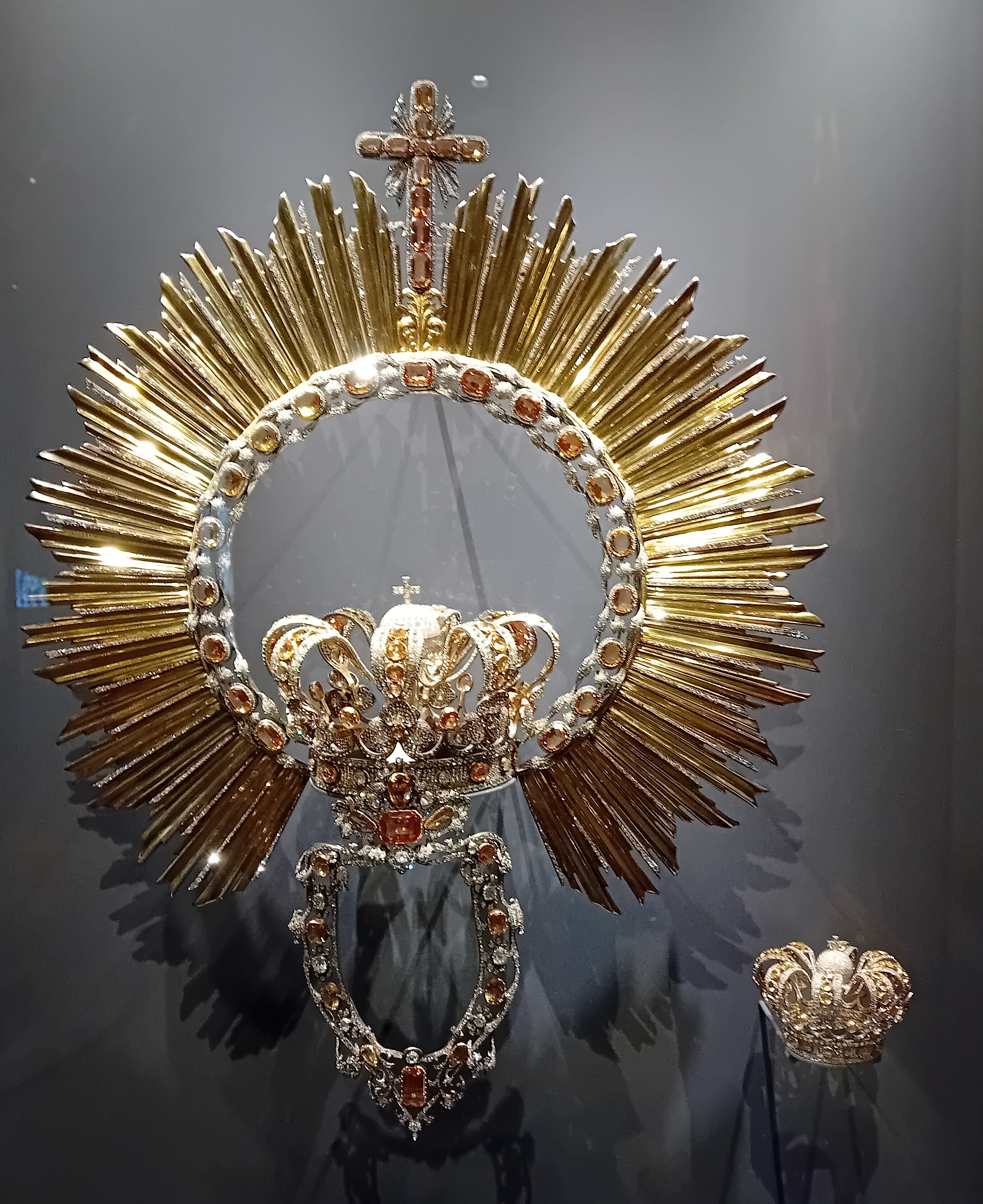
Crowns for the Virgin of Atocha and Child, c. 1852, Narciso Práxenes

== Awards ==
The museum building received two main awards:

- The Spanish Architecture Award (2017).
- The FAD Awards for Architecture and Interior Design (2017).

== See also ==
- Museo del Prado
- Museo Nacional Centro de Arte Reina Sofía
- Thyssen-Bornemisza Museum
