= Juan de Flandes =

Flemish painter (c.1460-c.1519)

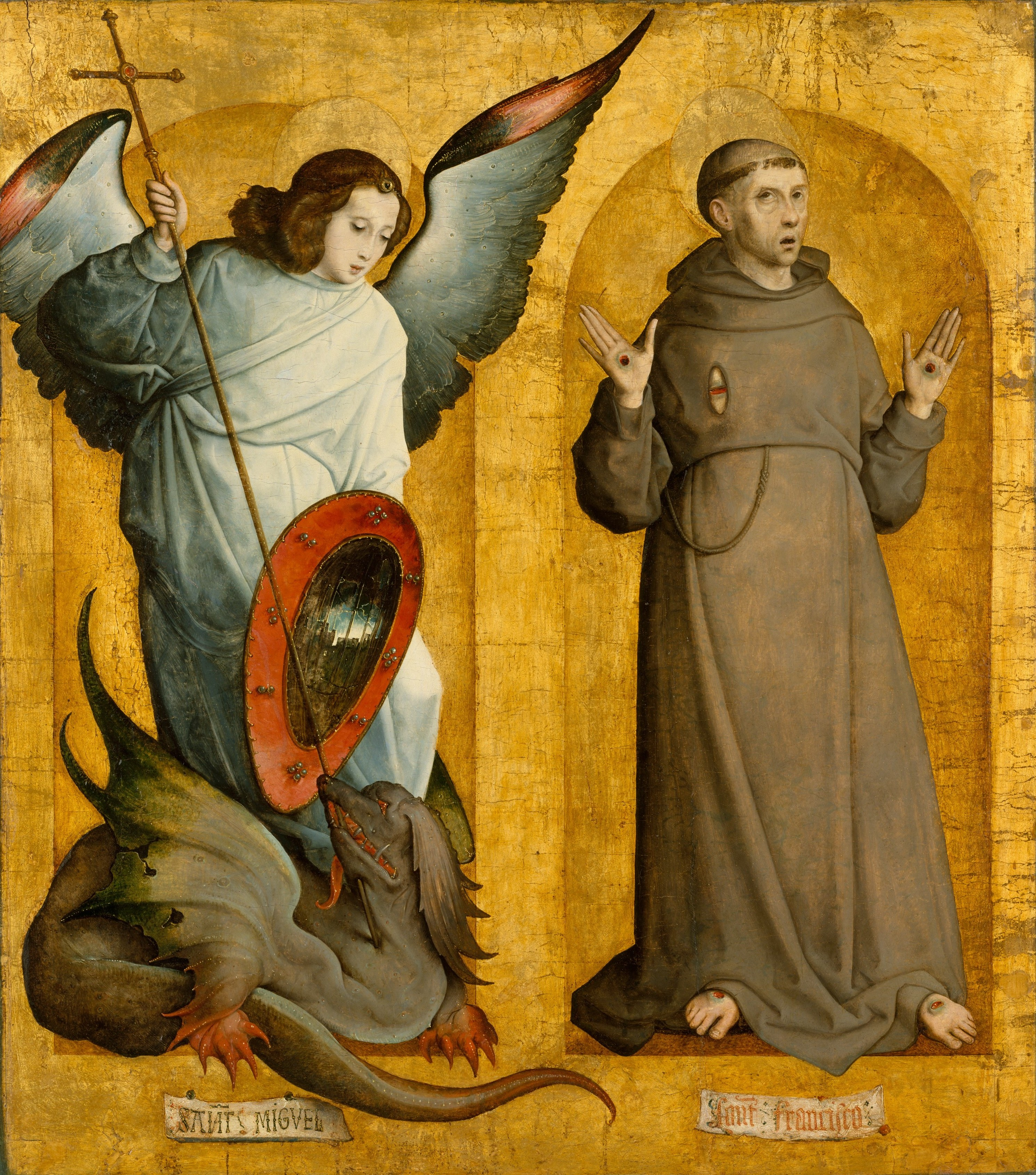
The Archangel Michael and Saint Francis of Assisi.

Juan de Flandes ("John of Flanders"; c. 1460 – by 1519) was a Flemish painter active in Spain from 1496 to 1519. His actual name is unknown, although an inscription Juan Astrat on the back of one work suggests a name such as "Jan van der Straat". Jan Sallaert, who became a master in Ghent in 1480, has also been suggested. He worked in the Early Netherlandish style.

== Life and works ==
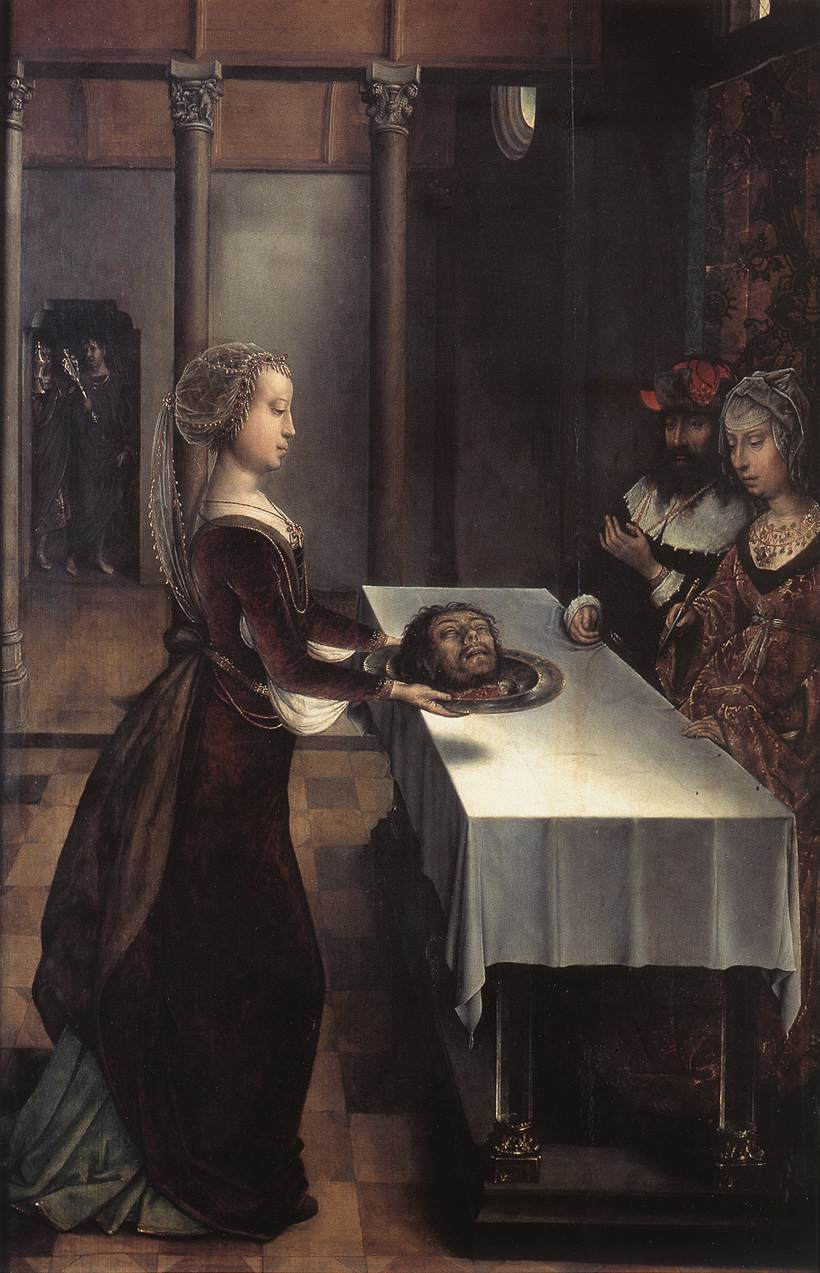
Salome with the head of John the Baptist, c. 1496, now in the Museum Mayer van den Bergh

He may have been born around 1460 somewhere in Flanders, Flandes in Spanish, which encompassed modern Belgium, Netherlands, Luxembourg and bordering regions of France. He evidently trained in his home country, most likely in Ghent, as his work shows similarities to that of Joos van Wassenhove, Hugo van der Goes and other Ghent artists. He is only documented after he became an artist at the court of Queen Isabella I of Castile, where he is first mentioned in the accounts in October 1496. He is described as "court painter" by 1498 and continued in the queen's service until her death in 1504. He likely lived in Burgos and mostly painted portraits of the royal family, but also the majority of a large series of small (21.3 x 16.7 cm) panels for a polyptych altarpiece for the queen. The panels have been dispersed and the largest number of panels is in the royal collection in Madrid.

After Isabella's death in 1504 Juan de Flandes turned to ecclesiastical commissions from Spanish churches, beginning in Salamanca in 1505–1507. He was later based in Palencia, where there is a large reredos in the cathedral. In Palencia, his wife was described as a widow in December 1519. The overwhelming majority of his work held in collections outside Spain dates from this later period during which he concentrated on religious themes. Panels from a large altarpiece from a Palencian church are divided between the Prado and National Gallery of Art, Washington, who have four panels each.

His works show the Early Netherlandish style of Ghent adapted to the Spanish taste and landscape, notably the requirements for groups of compartmented scenes for altarpieces. His colouring is refined, "with a preference for rather acid hues", and "while his feeling for space and light is sophisticated, a tendency to divide space into a succession of thin planes becomes a mannerism in his late works".

Albrecht Dürer praised Juan de Flandes's polyptych when he was shown it by Margaret of Austria in 1521: And on Friday Lady Margaret showed me all her beautiful things. Amongst them I saw about forty small oil pictures, the like of which for precision and excellence I have never beheld.

== Paintings ==
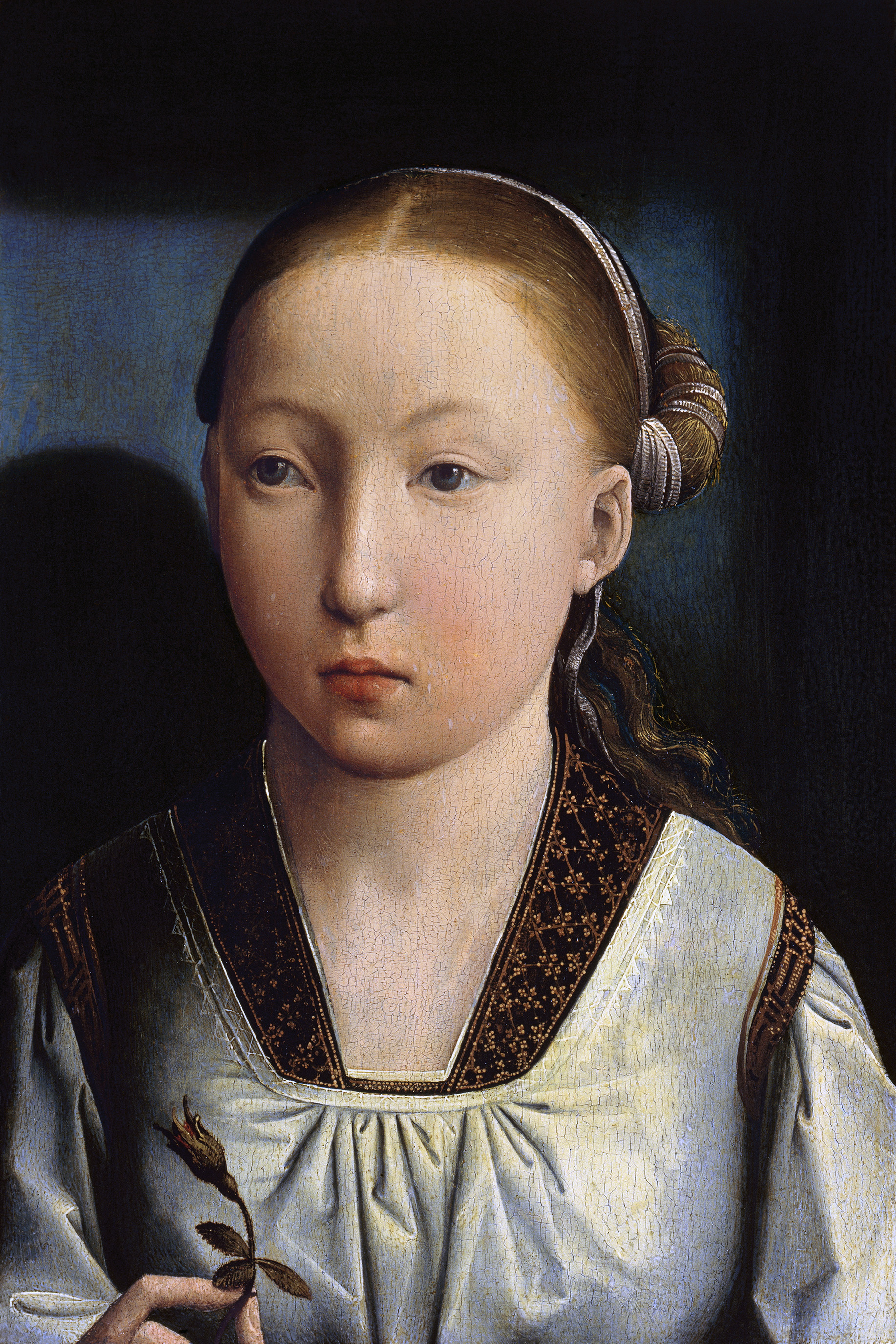
Catherine of Aragon, c. 1496, Thyssen-Bornemisza Museum, Madrid

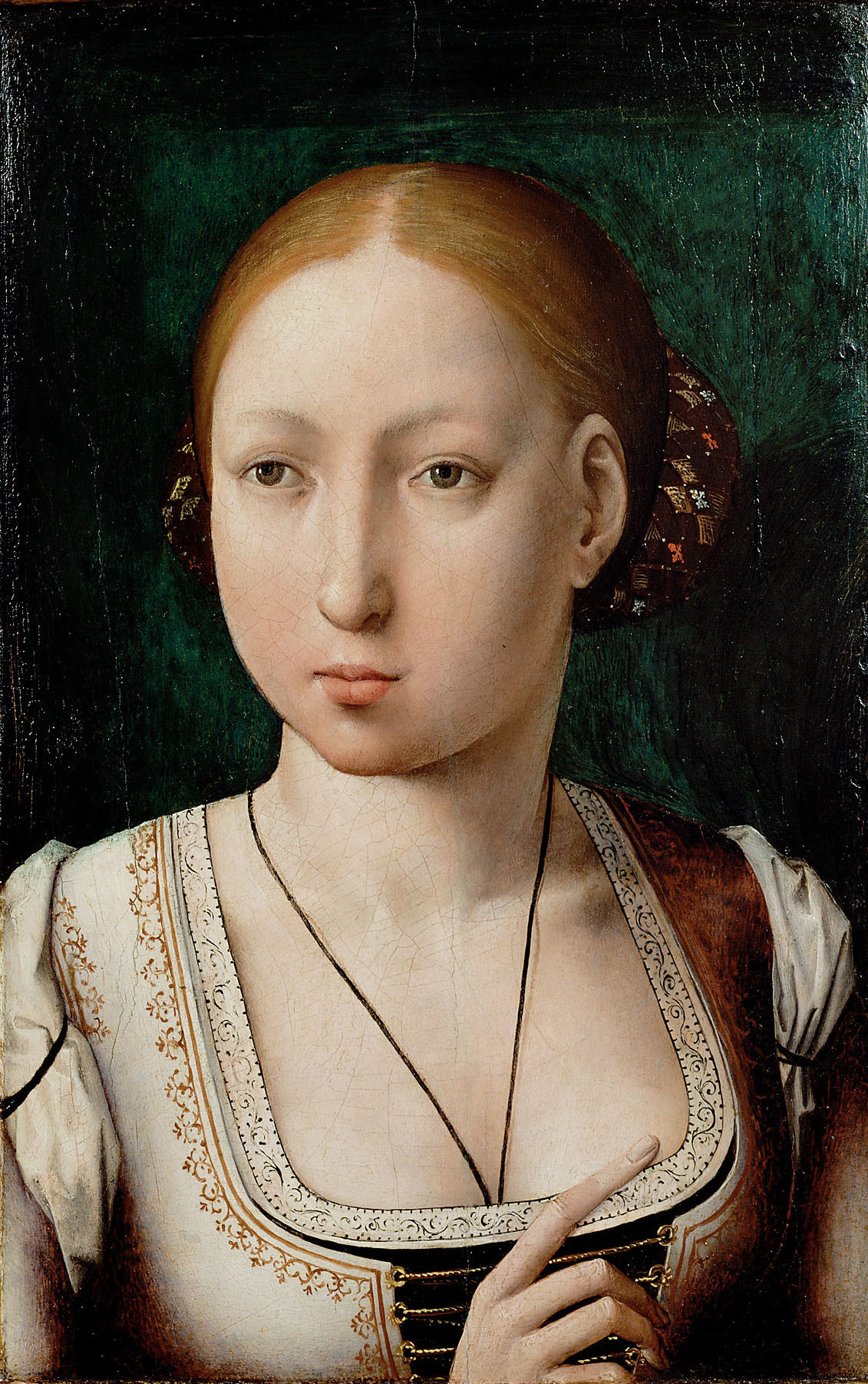
Joanna of Castile, c. 1500, Kunsthistorisches Museum, Vienna

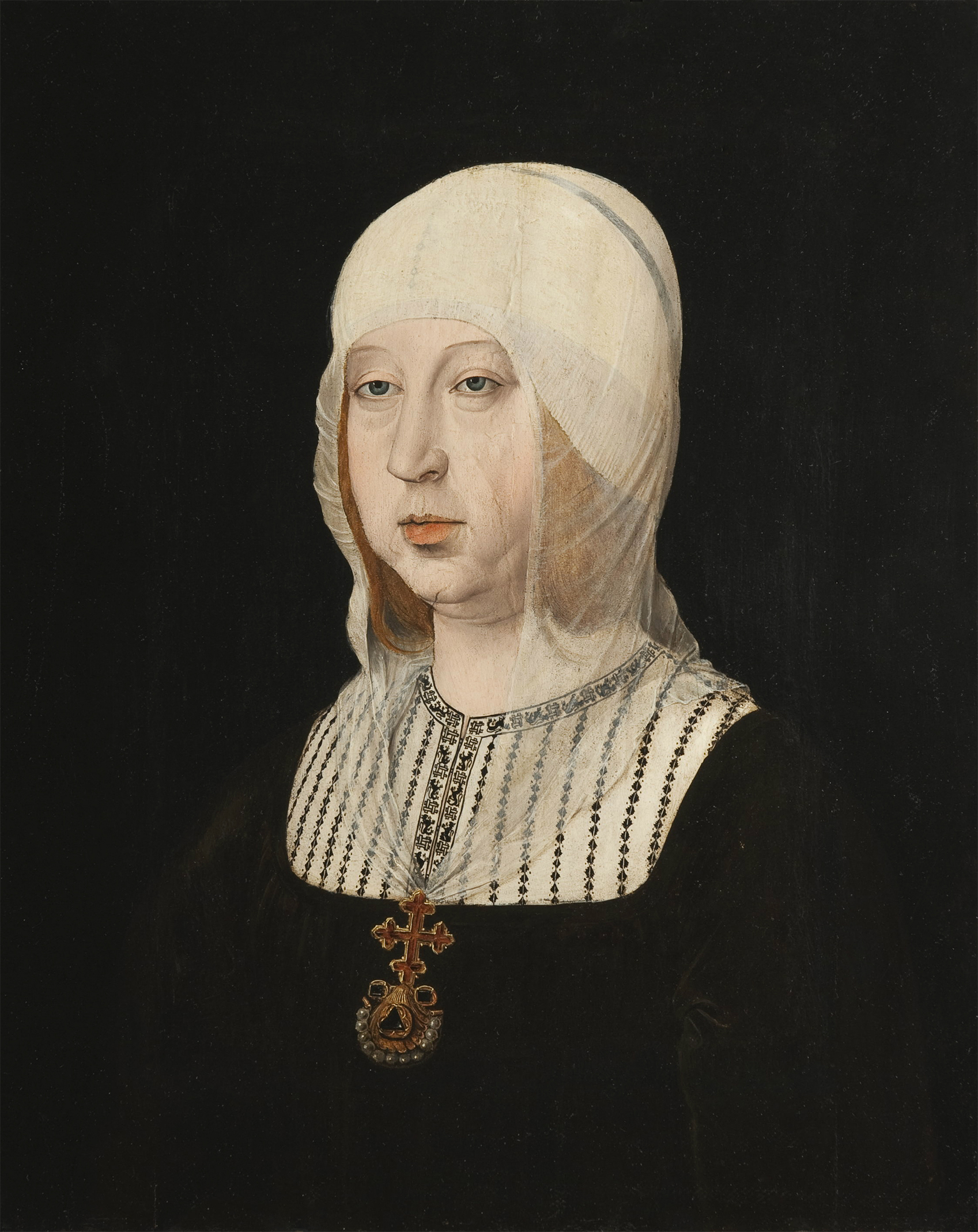
Isabella I of Castile, c. 1500–1504, Royal Collections Gallery, Madrid

Sermon of Saint John the Baptist (part of the polyptych of Isabel of Castile), 1497, National Museum of Serbia, Belgrade

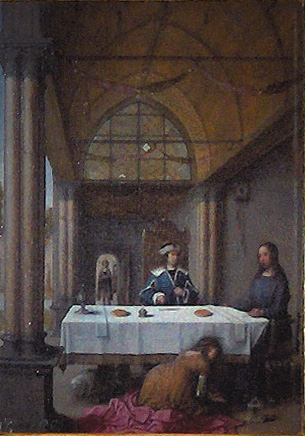
Supper in the House of Simon the Pharisee (part of the polyptych of Isabel of Castile), c. 1496–1504, Royal Collections Gallery, Madrid

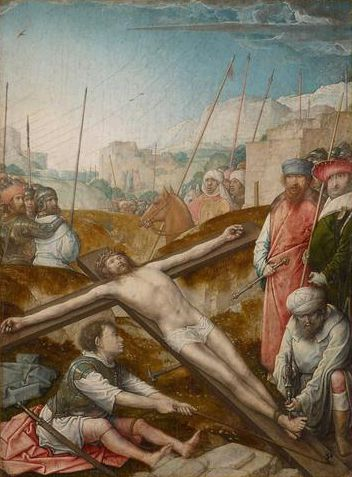
Christ nailed to the Cross (part of the polyptych of Isabel of Castile), Kunsthistorisches Museum, Vienna

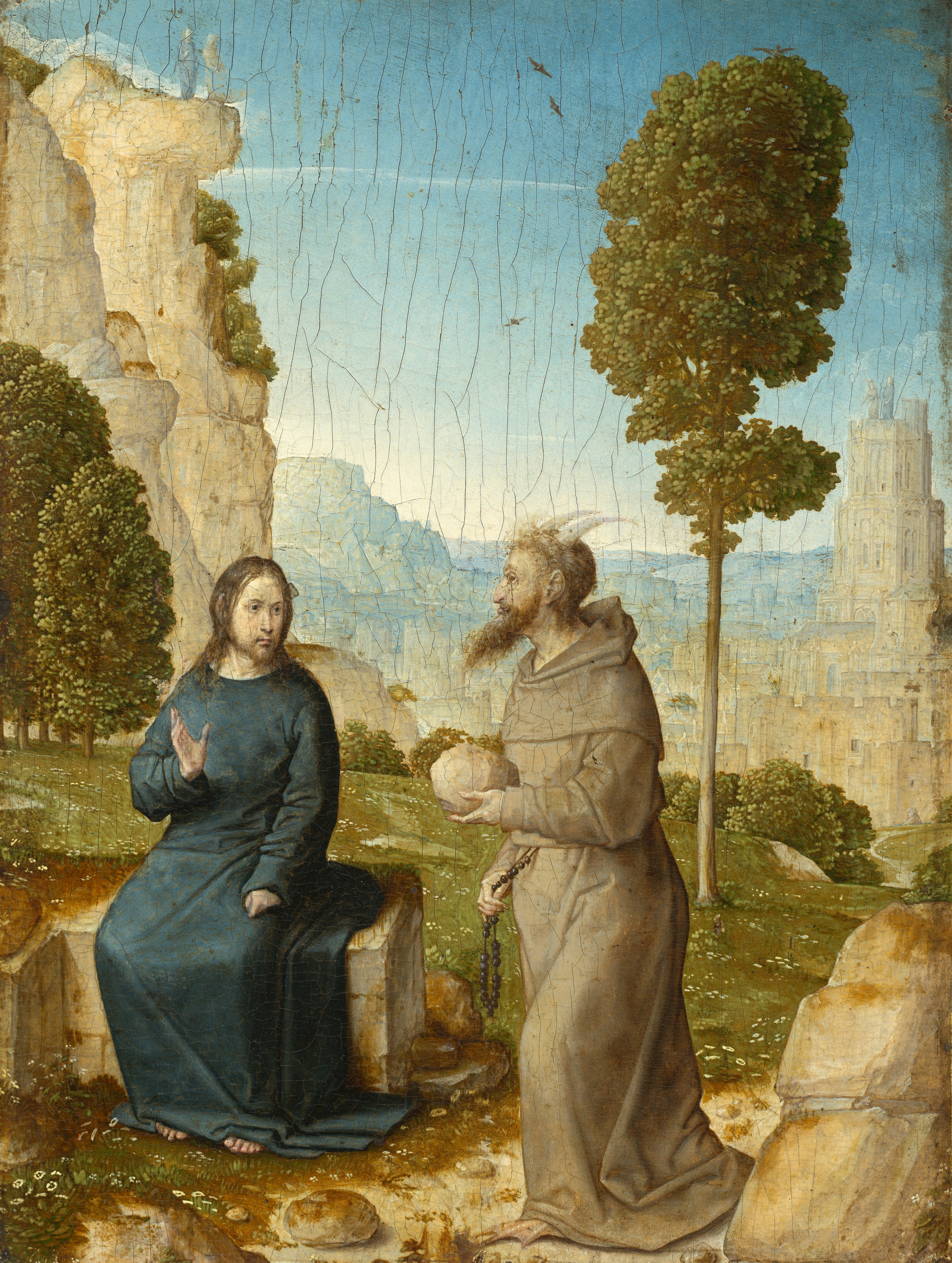
Temptation of Christ in the Wilderness (part of the polyptych of Isabel of Castile), National Gallery of Art, Washington D.C.

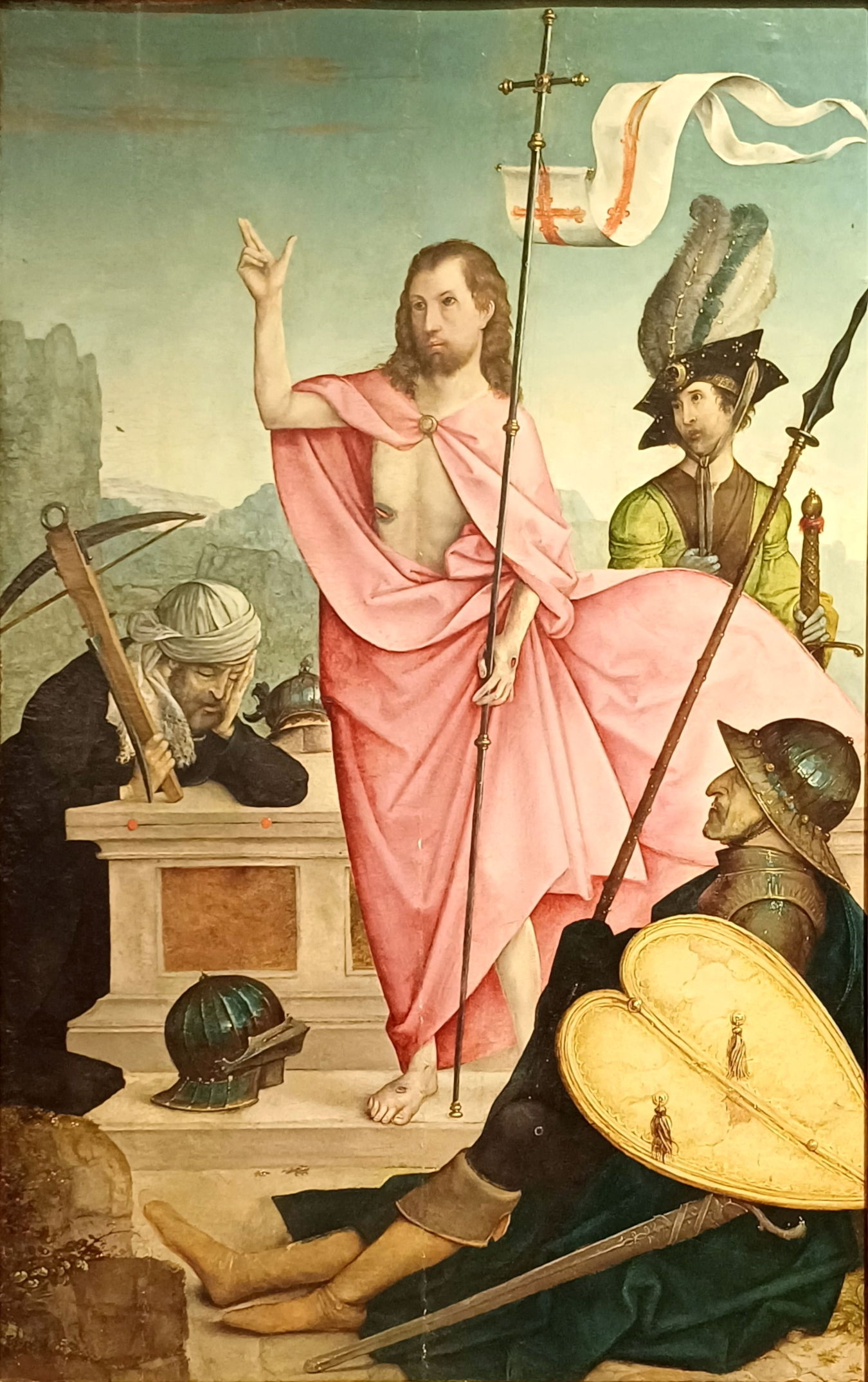
Resurrection of Christ, c. 1508, Soumaya Museum, Mexico City.

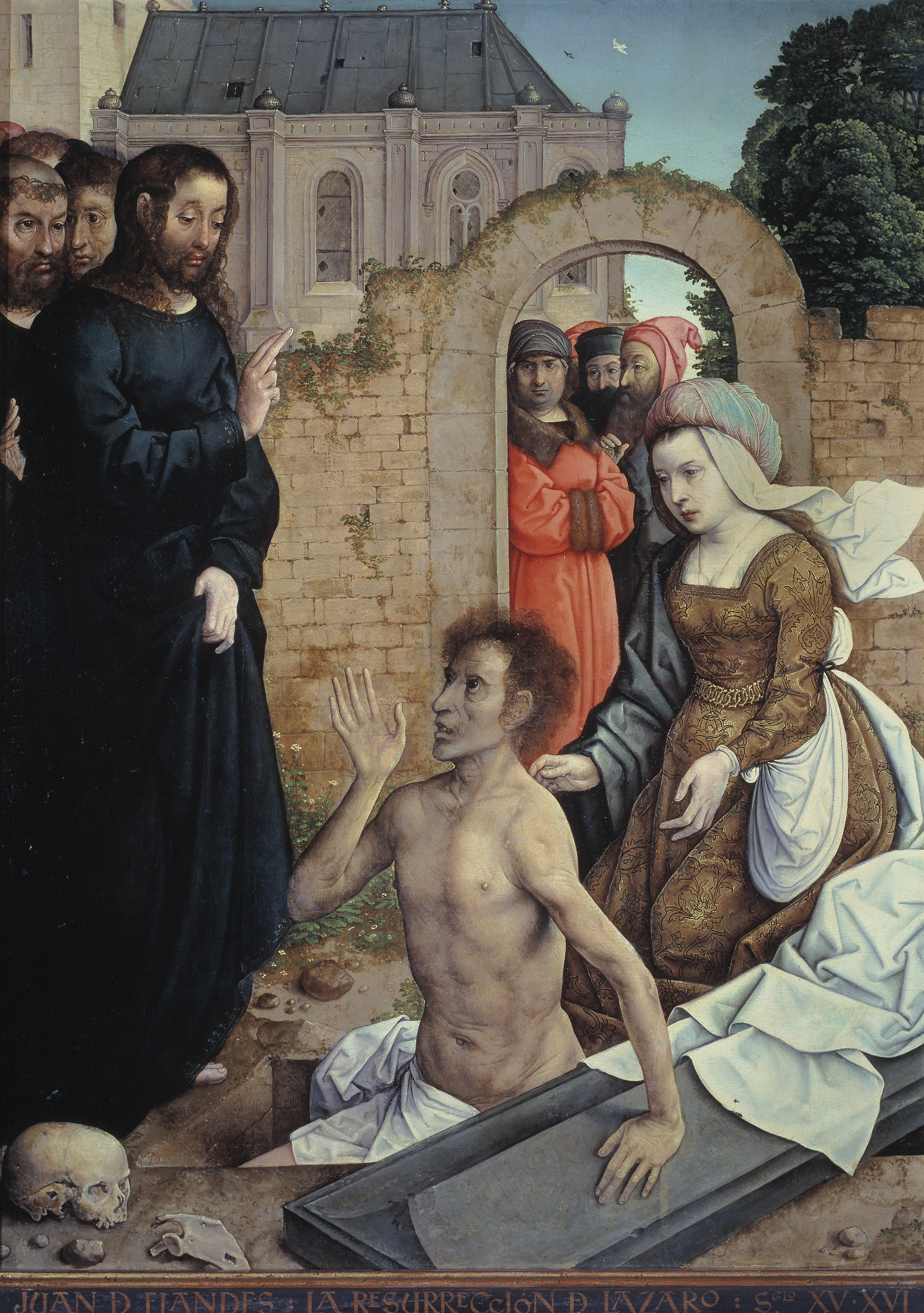
Resurrection of Lazarus, c. 1514–1519, Prado Museum, originally painted for the church of Saint Lazarus in Palencia.
